This is a list of songs about Los Angeles, California: either refer to, are set there, named after a location or feature of the city, named after a famous resident, or inspired by an event that occurred locally. In addition, several adjacent communities in the Greater Los Angeles Area such as West Hollywood, Beverly Hills, Santa Monica, Pasadena, Inglewood, and Compton are also included in this list despite being separate municipalities.  The songs listed are those that are notable or are by notable artists.

Songs

#s–A
 "10th & Crenshaw" by Fatboy Slim
 "100 Miles and Runnin'" by N.W.A
 "101 Eastbound" by Fourplay
 "The 103rd St. Theme" by Watts 103rd Street Rhythm Band
 "1977 Sunset Strip" by Low Numbers
 "2 A.M. on Mulholland Drive" by Bobby Please & The Pleasers
 "2 Fingers" by David Banner
 "21 Jumpstreet" by Snoop Dogg feat. Tray Deee
 "26 Miles (Santa Catalina)" by The Four Preps
 "2 Nigs United 4 West Compton" by Prince
 "29th Street" by David Benoit
 "213 to 619 Adjacent" by Abstract Rude
 "3 A.M. in L.A." by Jo Mama
 "30 Pier Avenue" by Andrew Hill
 "319 La Cienega" by Tony, Vic & Manuel
 "34th Street to L.A." by Dan Cassidy
 "3rd Base, Dodger Stadium" by Joe Kevany (Rearranged by Ry Cooder)
 "405 by RAC Andre Allan Anjos
 "4PM in Calabasas" by Drake (musician)
 "5 O'Clock In L.A." by Julie Covington
 "6 'n the Mornin'" by Ice-T
 "64 Bars on Wilshire" by Barney Kessel
 "77 Sunset Strip" by Alpinestars
 "77 Sunset Strip" by composers Mack David and Jerry Livingston
 "79th and Sunset" by Humble Pie
 "80 Blocks from Silverlake" by People Under the Stairs
 "808 Beats" by Unknown DJ
 "8069 Vineland" by Round Robin
 "90210" by Blackbear
 "90210" by Travis Scott feat. Kacy Hill
 "99 Miles from L.A." by Art Garfunkel and by Albert Hammond
 "A Malibu" by Caroline Loeb
 "...Aber Der Traum War Sehr Schön" by Julio Iglesias
 "Ænema" by Tool
 "Africa Unite" by Bob Marley & The Wailers & will.i.am
 "After Hollywood" by Michael Stanley
 "Afton Place" by The Beat (American band)
 "Ah-1, Ah-2, Ah-Sun-Set Strip" by Spike Jones
 "Ain't No California" by Mel Tillis
 "Ain't Nobody Straight in L.A." by The Miracles
 "Airhead" by Thomas Dolby
 "Alexandria & Me" by Ethan Gold
 "All Change for Hollywood" by UK Subs
 "All I Wanna Do" by Sheryl Crow
 "All Night All Right" by Peter Andre featuring Warren G
 "All the Gold in California" by Larry Gatlin & The Gatlin Brothers
 "(All the Rest Is) Hollywood" by Buzz Hawkins
 "All The Way from Memphis" by Mott The Hoople
 "Allied Chemical Square" by Jud Strunk
 "Alone in L.A." by Russell Stone & Peter Totth
 "Alta Loma Road" by Quantum Jump
 "Altadena In" by Fred Lonberg-Holm Frode Gjerstad
 "Always Into Somethin'" by N.W.A.
 "American Bad Ass" by Kid Rock
 "American Boy" by Estelle
 "An Old Hollywood Custom" music by Ray Henderson; lyrics by Lew Brown
 "Anaheim" by They Might Be Giants
 "...and a Song for Los Angeles" by She Wants Revenge
 "Andres" by L7
 "Angel City" by Don Johnson
 "Angel City" by Gil Fuller
 "Angel City" by Megabass (act had a top 20 British hit in 1990 with 'Time to Make the Floor Burn')
 "Angel City" by Motörhead
 "Angel City (We're Dying)" by Curt Boettcher
 "Angel On Sunset" by Larry Coryell
 "The Angel Song" by Great White
 "Angel Town" by Mezzoforte
 "Angel Town" by Peter Cincotti
 "Angelenos" by Michael Tomlinson
 "Angeles" by Elliott Smith
 "Angeles" by Josh Kelley
 "Angeles" by Peter Bradley Adams
 "Angeles (City Of The Angels)" by John Stewart
 "Angeles Domini" by The Nuns
 "Angeltown" by Bob Thompson & His Orchestra & Chorus
 "Annie Goes to Hollywood" by Franke & The Knockouts
 "Another Day Another Dollar" by Everything But The Girl
 "Another Day in Hollywood" by Diggy Tal & The Numbers
 "Another Day in L.A." by Indigo Swing
 "Another Day of Sun" by La La Land Cast
 "Another Nice Day in L.A." by Eddie Money
 "Another Night In Hollywood" by Grant & Forsyth
 "Another Sundown in Watts" by James Conwell
 "April 29, 1992 (Miami)" by Sublime
 "Aqui Vivo Yo L.A." by Alma
 "Area Code 213" by R. B. Greaves
 "As Real as Disneyland" by Julian Dawson
 "Assault on Precinct 13" by John Carpenter
 "At the House on Sunset" (from the musical 'Sunset Boulevard')
 "At The Roxy" by Midnight Eyes
 "Atlantis Is Calling (SOS For Love)" by Modern Talking
 "August In Azusa" by Jerry Colonna
 "Avenue of the Stars" by Jennifer Love Hewitt

B–D
 "Baby Got Back"  by Sir Mix-a-Lot
 "Babylon Sisters" by Steely Dan
 "Back for You" by Dilated Peoples
 "Back from Cali " by Slash featuring Myles Kennedy
 "Back From Hollywood" George White's Scandals 1931
 "Back in L.A." by B.B.King
 "Back in L.A." by Johnny Hallyday
 "Back in L.A." by Peanut Butter Conspiracy
 "Back in L.A." by Phil & The Noise 
 "Back on the Street" by Dyan Diamond
 "Back Street Hollywood" by The Durbervilles
 "Back to L.A." by Sylvie Vartan
 "Back to L.A." by Unnatural Axe
 "Back to L.A." by XL Middleton
 "Bad Boy" by Wildchild (aka as Roger McKenzie)
 "Bad Night at the Whiskey" by The Byrds
 "Bad Sneakers" by Steely Dan
 "Bad Year at UCLA" by Game Theory
 "Balboa Blue" by The T-Bones
 "Ballad of a Teenage Queen" by Johnny Cash
 "Ballad of Hollywood" by Rod McKuen And The Keystone 4
 "The Ballad of Jed Clampett" by Jerry Scoggins, Flatt and Scruggs
 "Ballad of Johnny" by Urban Fate
 "Ballad of Los Angeles" by Harpo
 "Bam Bam In L.A. City" by Willo Wilson & Mikey Jarrett (reggae)
 "The Bandits of Beverly Hills" by Kris Kristofferson
 "Barbie Girl" by Aqua
 "Barefoot in Beverly Hills" by Grace Jones
 "Barrio Suite" by Tierra
 "The Bars in L.A." by Jack Elliott
 "The Bay to L.A." by The Grouch featuring Murs
 "Be A Believer In Dodger Fever" by the Paid Attendance
 "Beach Baby" by The First Class
 "A Beautiful Day In L.A." by Arno
 "Beautiful Downtown Burbank" by Freddie Cannon
 "Beautiful in Los Angeles" by Garrison Starr
 "Beauty Queen of Watts" by the Moles
 "Because, It's Midnite" by Limozeen
 "Bedford Drive" by Artie Shaw
 "Been to Hell" by Hollywood Undead
 "Before Hollywood" by The Saints
 "Bel Air" by Can
 "Bel Air" by the Church
 "Bel Air ~Kuuhaku no Shunkan no Naka De~" by Malice Mizer
 "Bel Air" by Lana Del Rey
 "Bel Air Boogie" by Rob Hoeke
 "Bel Air Rain" by Lindsay Buckingham
 "Belew Jay Way" by ProjeKct X (connected to King Crimson)
 "Betty's Office at Paramount" (from the musical Sunset Boulevard)
 "Beverly Drive" by Hal Blaine
 "Beverly Glen" by Country
 "Beverly Hillbillies" by Louis Calhoun
 "Beverly Hills" from the album of The Beverly Hillbillies
 "Beverly Hills" by The Circle Jerks
 "Beverly Hills by Claude Bolling and Hubert Laws
 "Beverly Hills" by Jeff Baxter, Teddy Castellucci, James Harrah, Buzz Feiten
 "Beverly Hills" by Micky Dolenz
 "Beverly Hills" by Uncle Sound
 "Beverly Hills" by Weezer
 "Theme from Beverly Hills 90210" by John Davis
 "Beverly Hills Blues" by Bobby McFerrin
 "Beverly Hills Goes To Acid" by Take It To The Streets
 "Beverly Hills Rag* by Marcello Minerbi
 "Beverly Hills Rapp (Movie Theme)" by Future MC's
 "Beverly Kills (Freaks With Golden Heirs)" by Ariel Pink's Haunted Graffiti
 "Bi-Coastal" by Peter Allen
 "Big Bel Air" by Corbin/Hanner
 "Big City" by Wall of Voodoo
 "Big Energy" by Latto
 "Big Dreams" by The Game
 "Big Dumb Town" by Stan Ridgway
 "Big in LA" by Joelle
 "The Big Noise From Encino" by Julius Wechter & the Baja Marimba Band
 "Big Noise from L.A." by Frosty Harris & The Kool-Tones
 "A Big Star in Hollywood" by Sandra Dickinson
 "Bike Up the Strand" by Gerry Mulligan
 "Biking Up the Strand" by Peter Baumann
 "Billy the Mountain" by Frank Zappa
 "B***ch With A Perm" by Tim Dog
 "Bizarre in L.A." by Mark Ashton
 "Blackhawks Over Los Angeles" by Strung Out
 "Black Planet" by The Sisters of Mercy
 "Black Tie White Noise" by David Bowie
 "Bloody Mary Morning" by Willie Nelson
 "Blow" by The Beat Pirate
 "Blow Me Back Santa Ana" by Tim Rose
 "Blue Hills Of Pasadena" by Plaza Band
 "Blue Jay Way" by The Beatles
 "Blue Malibu" by George Shearing
 "Blue Night on the Strip" by Warren Barker
 "Bluegrass in Hollywood" by Smiley Monroe & The Golden State Boys
 "Blues For L.A." by L.A. Carnival
 "Blues in Torrance" by Buddy Collette Big Band 
 "Boards and Bikinis Rule (Down at Malibu)" by The Hollyberries
 "Bondage on the Boulevards" by The Skyhooks
 "Bonita Applebum" by A Tribe Called Quest
 "Boogin' At Berg's" by Slim Gaillard
 "Boogie Woogie at the Philharmonic" by Meade Lux Lewis
 "Born and Raised in Compton" by DJ Quik
 "Born in East L.A." by Cheech Marin
 "Botanica De Los Angeles" by Xiu Xiu
 "Boulevard" by Jackson Browne (references Hollywood Boulevard)
 "Boulevard L.A." by Bachelor Of Hearts
 "Boulevard Nights" by Mellow Man Ace
 "Boyle Heights" by Chuck Higgins& His Mellotones
 "Boyle Heights Affair" by Oicho
 "Boys in L.A." by Ru Carley
 "Boys On Hollywood Blvd." by Elite
 "Boyz-n-the-Hood" by N.W.A featuring Eazy-E
 "Brad Logan" by Rancid
 "BRB/Kiss" by LANY
 "Bring It On" by South Central Cartel
 "Broadway Boogie" by Sweeney Todd
 "Broadway - Hollywood - Beverly Hills" by Vengeance
 "Broadway's Closer to Sunset Boulevard" by Isley Jasper Isley
 "Broken Headlights" by Roscoe & Etta ft. Maia Sharp & Anna Schulze
 "Brooklyn To L.A." by Doctor Ice
 "Brother L.A." by Daniel Lanois
 "Brother's Gonna Work It Out" (Remix) by Public Enemy
 "Brought Up in New York (Brought Down in L.A.)" by Paul Anka
 "Bumpin' on Sunset" by Julie Driscoll with Brian Auger and the Trinity
 "Bunker Hill" by Jimmie Haskell
 "Bunker Hill" by Michael Penn (references the Bunker Hill section of Downtown Los Angeles as well as Vermont Avenue, a major north–south thoroughfare in the city)
 "Bunker Hill" by Red Hot Chili Peppers
 "The Burn" by Framing Hanley
 "Burn Hollywood Burn" by Public Enemy
 "Burn Silver Lake Burn" by Streetwalkin' Cheetahs Meet Cherie Currie
 "Burpin' Burbank" by Gary Farr
 "Buzzsaw of Hollywood Hill" by The Raymen
 "BX Warrior" by Tim Dog
 "By the Time I Get to Phoenix" by Isaac Hayes
 "Cabin Fever" by Wonder Stuff
 "Cafe L.A." by Tony Sciuto
 "Calabasas California 91302" by Albert Hammond
 "Califormula" by Blackbear
 "California" by Lana Del Rey
 "California" by 88rising, Rich Brain, NIKI, Warren Hue
 "California" by Colonel Loud featuring T.I.,  Ricco Barrino and Young Dolph
 "California" by Debby Boone
 "California" by Jay Farrar
 "California" by The Adicts
 "California" by Joni Mitchell
 "California" by Hollywood Undead
 "California" by Lil Rob
 "California" by Metro Station
 "California" by Rufus Wainwright
 "California" by Phantom Planet
 "California" by The Rentals (often mislabelled as Weezer)
 "California" by Tom Petty and the Heartbreakers
 “California” by Yungblud
 "California" by Urban Fate
 "California Dreamin'" by The Mamas & the Papas
 "California Girls" by The Beach Boys
 "California Girls" by David Lee Roth
 "California Girls" by Oingo Boingo
 "California Gurls" by Katy Perry featuring Snoop Dogg
 "California, Hollywood" by Michael Rabon & Choctaw
 "California Heaven" by JAHKOY feat. ScHoolboy Q
 "California Home" by Mark Eric
 "California Jam" by Klaatu
 "California King Bed" by Rihanna
 "California Love" by 2Pac featuring Dr. Dre
 "California Paradise" by The Runaways
 "California Rain" by Silvertide
 "California Sex Lawyer" by Fountains of Wayne
 "California Stars" by Woody Guthrie, Jay Bennett & Jeff Tweedy
 "California Style" by Eddy Grant
 "California Soul" by Marlena Shaw
 "California Suite" by Elena Duran & And The Laurie Holloway Trio
 "California Sun" by Devon Werkheiser
 "California Sun" by The Rivieras
 "California Trees" by Walk off the Earth
 "California Vacation" by The Game, Snoop Dogg & Xzibit
 "Californication" by Red Hot Chili Peppers
 "Calistan" by Frank Black
 "Camel Island" by David Sanborn
 "Camera One" by the Josh Joplin Group
 "Campo De Encino" by Jimmy Webb
 "Candy" by Robbie Williams
 "Can't Stop the Blue (Go Dodgers Go!)" by Ozomatli
 "Can't You See" by Total (girl group) featuring Notorious B.I.G.
 "Carmelita" by Warren Zevon
 "Carson City" by Boo-Yaa T.R.I.B.E
 "Carson Girls" by Angry Samoans
 "Catalina Island" by Mike Patton
 "Catch My Disease" by Ben Lee
 "Caught Up In Los Angeles" by Gary Private
 "Celebrity Skin" by Hole
 "Celluloid Heroes" by The Kinks
 "Cemetery" by Strung Out
 "Central Avenue Boogie" by Helen Humes
 "Central Avenue Breakdown" by Lionel Hampton
 "Central Avenue Confidential" by Big Jay McNeely
 "Central Avenue Cruise" by Dave "Baby" Cortez
 "Central Avenue Drag" by Pete Johnson
 "Central Avenue Shuffle" by Ozzie Nelson and his Orchestra 
 "Central Rocks" by Edward "Gates" White
 "Century City" by Adrian Baker
 "Century City" by Galactic
 "Century City" by Tom Petty and the Heartbreakers
 "Century City Chase Or J.B. In Teheran" by B.B.King
 "Century City Rag" by The Last
 "Champagne" by 311
 "Chasing" by Holes In Blackburn
 "Chateau Marmont" by Van Dyke Parks
 "Chelsea" by The Summer Set
 "Cherokee in Hollywood" by Johnny Eagle Feather
 "Chilling on the Westside" by Boo-Yaa T.R.I.B.E.
 "Theme from 'Chinatown'" by Jerry Goldsmith
 "Christmas in Los Angeles" by Lawrence Welk and The Rockettes
 "Christmas in Hollywood" by Hollywood Undead
 "Christmas In L.A." by The Bobs
 "Christmas in Malibu" by The Radudes
 "Christmas in the City of the Angels" by Johnny Mathis
 "Christmas Wrapping" by Save Ferris
 "Christmastime in Tinsel Town" by Big Bad Voodoo Daddy
 "Chumash" by Surf Punks
 "Ciao L.A." by Chokebore
 "Ciclon" by Sick Jacken Vs. DJ Muggs
 "Cimarron Street Breakdown" by Big Joe Turner
 "The City" by The Game feat. Kendrick Lamar
 "City of Angels" by 10,000 Maniacs
 "City of Angels" by 24kGoldn
 "City of Angels" by Thirty Seconds to Mars, music video filmed in L.A.
 "City of Angels" by Cactus World News
 "City of Angels" by Captain Rizz
 "City of Angels" by The Burritos
 "Theme from City of Angels" (from City of Angels (musical))
 "City of Angels" by Miguel
 "City of Angels" by The Distillers
 "City of Angels" by Elevation vs Grube & Hovsepian
 "City of Angels" by The Generators
 "City of Angels" by The Highlights
 "City of Angels" by Jay Ferguson
 "City of Angels" by Jonathan King
 "City of Angels" by Demi Lovato
 "City of Angels" by Marvin Rainwater
 "City of Angels" by The Miracles
 "City of Angels" by Nik Kershaw
 "City of Angels" by Ozomatli
 "City of Angels" by Red Elvises
 "City of Angels" by The Savage Rose
 "City of Angels" by The Thrillseekers
 "City of Angels" by The Unknowns
 "City of Angels" by Wayne Duncan
 "City of Angels (Dumb Ol' Country Boy) by 10 City Run
 "City of Devils" by Yellowcard
 "City of the Angels" by Bill Withers
 "City of the Angels" by Dave Dudley
 "City Of The Angels" by Elyse Weinberg
 "City of the Angels" by Fred Astaire
 "City of the Angels" by Jimmy C. Newman
 "City of the Angels" by Journey
 "City of the Angels" by Gowan
 "City of the Angels" by Linda Hargrove
 "City of the Angels" by Michael Johnson
 "City of the Angels" by Neil Innes
 "City of the Angels" by Bob Saker
 "City of the Angels" by Wang Chung
 "City of the Angels (Los Angeles)" by Bruce Cloud with the Joe Vento Orchestra	
 "City of Stars" by Ryan Gosling and Emma Stone
 "The City with Two Faces" ( "Fuck L.A.") by Goldfinger
 "Classic Hollywood Ending" by Stan Ridgway
 "Clifton in the Rain" by Al Stewart
 "Cobra Skullifornia" by Cobra Skulls
 "Colazione a Disneyland" by Premiata Forneria Marconi
 "Cold and Windy Night" by The Fantastic Four (band)
 "Cold as a Hollywood Kiss" by Blackhawk (band)
 "Cold in California" by Shawn Mendes
 "Cold in LA" by Why Don't We
 "Cold Rock A Party" by MC Lyte
 "The Coldest Rap" by Ice-T
 "Coldwater Canyon" by Dory Previn
 "Colors" by Ice-T
 "The Colors of Malibu" by Gary Farr
 "Come a Long Way" by Michelle Shocked
 "Come Monday" by Jimmy Buffett
 "Come to L.A." by Caviar
 "Come to L.A." by Chilly
 "Come to L.A." by Swamp Dogg
 "Come To Los Angeles" by LaBlonde
 "Comin' into Los Angeles" by Arlo Guthrie
 "Coming Of Age In L.A." by West Coast Pop Art Experimental Band
 "Coming to America" by the System
 "Compton" by The Game
 "Compton" by Kendrick Lamar featuring Dr. Dre
 "Compton Brooklyn" by SMG
 "Compton Hoochies" by Hi-C
 "Compton's in the House" by N.W.A.
 "Compton's Lynchin'" by Compton's Most Wanted
 "Concrete Schoolyard" by Jurassic 5
 "Cool Nights and Hollywood Lights" by Gary Farr
 "Corrido de Boxeo" by Ry Cooder
 "Couldn't Get It Right" by Climax Blues Band
 "Country Boy (You Got Your Feet in L.A.)" by Glen Campbell
 "A Country Mile" by Everything but the Girl
 "Covina" by Shakatak
 "Cowboy" by Kid Rock
 "Cowboys and Indians" by The Cross (featuring Roger Taylor (Queen drummer))
 "Cowboys from Hollywood" by Camper Van Beethoven
 "Cracked Actor" by David Bowie
 "Cradlesong" by Rob Thomas
 "Crash Course to Hollywood" by Tim Halperin
 "Crazy as a Loon" by John Prine
 "Creep 'N Crawl" by Eazy-E
 "Creeping Coastline of Lights" by Leaving Trains
 "Crenshaw" by Skee-Lo
 "Cribs L.A." by Lil Dicky
 "Croydon" by Captain Sensible
 "The Cruel Master of My Dreams (Malibu) by Janis Siegel
 "Crunchy Beach 3/Hollywood" by Neil Innes
 "Cruiser" by Red House Painters
 "Cruisin' (Lucy and Ramona and Sunset Sam)" by Michael Nesmith
 "Crusin' Down Sunset" by Light A Big Fire	
 "Cruisin' on Sunset" by Oliver Sain
 "Cruisin' Ventura Blvd." by Gary Farr
 "Cruising Central Ave." by 4th Coming
 "Cruising Down on Sunset" by Thomas Anders
 "Cruisin' the Streets" by Boys Town Gang
 "Crystal Palace" by Stan Ridgway
 "Culver Moon" by Jackson Browne
 "Dance Yourself Dizzy" by Liquid Gold
 "Danger" by Mötley Crüe
 "Dangerous Sex" by Tackhead
 "Dark Side of L. A." by Faith Band
 "Das Hollywood-Schaukellied (Auf der bunten Hollywood-Schaukel)" by Bill Ramsey (singer)
 "Das War Hollywood Von Gestern" by Waterloo & Robinson
 "Dawn Storm" by T. Rex
 "Day After Day (It's Slippin' Away) by Shango
 "The Day the Niggaz Took Over" by Dr. Dre
 "Daytona 500" by The Game
 "Dead in Hollywood" by the Murderdolls
 "Dead Loss Angeles" by The Stranglers
 "Dead Man's Curve" by Jan and Dean
 "Debra" by Beck
 "Deep Kick" by Red Hot Chili Peppers
 "Deez Hollywood Nights" by Snoop Dogg
 "Denver to L.A." by Paula Wayne
 "Der Zug Nach L.A." by Klaus Hill
 "Desire (Hollywood Mix)" by U2
 "Descanso Drive" by Bill Bergman
 "Desperados Under the Eaves" by Warren Zevon
 "Diary of a San Fernando Sexx Star" by Butch Walker
 "Die in Disneyland" by Jimmy Pursey
 "Disco Cops" by Billy Howard
 "Disco Really Made It!" by Gruppo Sportivo
 "Disneyland" by Alan Barton & Colin Routh
 "Disneyland" by Come On
 "Disneyland" by Daniel (Montenegrin singer)
 "Disneyland" by Disneyland
 "Disneyland" by Do-Re-Mi (band) 
 "Disneyland" by The Eyes
 "Disneyland" by Five Americans
 "Disneyland" by Michael Rabon
 "Disneyland" by Pico
 "Disneyland" (from Smile (musical))
 "Disneyland Daddy" by Paul Evans (musician)
 "Disneyland Forever" by The Mighty Wah! (featuring Pete Wylie)
 "Disneyland Is Burning" by Alabama 3
 "Divers Do It Deeper" by David Allan Coe
 "Dizneyland Everyday" by Bobsled
 "Dizz Knee Land" by Dada (band)
 "DJ Green Lantern "D.O.A." Freestyle Part 2" by Slaughterhouse
 "Do the Slauson" by Round Robin & The Parlays (the Parlays were The Blossoms under a different name)
 "Do You Know the Way to San Jose" by Dionne Warwick
 "Do You Remember That Night In Pasadena" by Al Martino
 "Dodger Blue" by Sue Raney
 "Dodgers Charge" by Bill Reeves
 "Dodgers Song" by Danny Kaye
 "Does the Wind Still Blow in Oklahoma?" by Reba McEntire and Ronnie Dunn
 "Dog Breath" by Frank Zappa (El Monte)
 "Doggy Dog World" by Snoop Dogg
 "Dogs of L.A." by Liz Phair
 "Don't Get Stopped in Beverly Hills" by Shalamar
 "Don't Mean Nothing" by Richard Marx
 "Don't Stop Believing" by Journey (band)
 "Don't Take Your Love to Hollywood" by Kelly Marie
 "Don't Ya Dare Laugh by B-real feat. Young De
 "Donte's Inferno" by Joe Pass
 "Dope Show" by Marilyn Manson
 "Down And Out In Beverly Hills Theme" by Andy Summers
 "(Down In) East L.A. by The Angelenos
 "Down in Hollywood" by Killer Dwarfs
 "Down in Hollywood" by Ry Cooder
 "Down in L.A." by People Under The Stairs
 "Down on Sunset" by Mezzoforte
 "Down on the Boulevard" by The Pop
 "Down Rodeo" by Rage Against the Machine
 "Down To L.A." by Nightlights
 "Down Whittier Blvd" by Thee Midniters
 "Downey, California" by Saint Etienne
 "Downtown L.A." by Glenn Yarbrough
 "Downtown L.A. 1937" by Harald Kloser
 "DTLA (Downtown Los Angeles)" by Gary Jules
 "Dr Feelgood" by Mötley Crüe
 "Dre Day" by Dr. Dre
 "Dreaming Of L.A." by Morel
 "Dreams" by The Game
 "Drinkin' and Dreamin'" by Waylon Jennings
 "Drinking in L.A." by Bran Van 3000
 "Drive By" by Duran Duran
 "Drivin' Down to O.C." by Gary Farr
 "Driving Down Alvarado" by Anne McCue
 "Drop Dead L.A." by B-Movie Rats
 "Drunk in LA" by Beach House
 "Dying in LA" by Panic! At The Disco

E–G
 "California EGGS" by Jeff Huang
 "Earthquake in L.A." by Nervous Tension
 "East L.A." by Bob Arlin
 "East L.A." by Bob Seger and the Silver Bullet Band
 "East L.A" by Solid Jackson
 "East L.A." by War
 "East L.A. Breeze" by Brazzaville
 "East Los Down South" by Lencho Lockjaw
 "East Side Drama" by Brownside
 "East Side Rendezvous" by Frost
 "East Side/West Side" by Slow Pain
 "East Side West Side" by Tony Yayo
 "Eastside Westside" by Lil 1/2 Dead
 "Eastside-Westside" by Young Soldierz
 "East Side West Side Blue" by Big Sir
 "East vs. West" by Chubb Rock
 "Echo Park" by Brooklyn Bridge
 "Echo Park" by Feeder
 "Echo Park" by Joseph Arthur
 "Echo Park" by Keith Barbour
 "Echo Park" by Ryan Cabrera
 "Eden" by Sara Bareilles
 "Eine Rose Aus Santa Monica" by Carmela Corren
 "El Camino Real" by Rockin' Foo
 "El Cerrito Place" written by Keith Gattis, made popular by Charlie Robison, covered by Kenny Chesney
 "El Dorado" by Death Cab for Cutie
 "El Lay" by NOFX
 "El Lay" by Snoop Dogg feat Marty James
 "El Lay (L.A.)" by Los Illegals
 "Electric Los Angeles Sunset" by Al Stewart
 "Electric Neon Sunset" by L.A. Guns
 "Electrolite" by R.E.M.
 "Empty Hearted Town" by Warren Zevon
 "Encino" by The Ramrocks
 "Epilogue" from Jeff Wayne's Musical Version of The War of the Worlds  
 "Escape From L.A." by John Carpenter & Alan Howarth (composer)   
 "Esmeralda's Hollywood" by Steve Earle
 "Eugene (The Hollywood Monster Movie Fiend)" by Metal Mickey
 "Event#5 (Mortlake Mooch)" by Sphincter Ensemble 
 "Everybody's Been To L.A." by Kippi Brannon
 "(Everybody's Goin') Hollywood" by Marc Allen Trujillo
 "Everyone Is Someone In L.A." by Felix Da Housecat
 "Everywhere But Hollywood" by Tracy Lawrence
 "F64 Freestyle" by Low Key
 "The Face" by And Why Not
 "Face of L.A" by The Game
 "Faceoff at Point Dume" by The Malibooz
 "Fairfax Avenue" by Bull Lee
 "Fairfax Avenue" by Gefilte Joe and the Fish
 "Fairfax Avenue" by Helen St. John
 "Fairfax Kid" by Six Volt Sunbeam
 "Fairfax Rag" by Harry Nilsson
 "Fallen Angel" by Poison
 "Fancy" by Iggy Azalea
 "Fancy Lady, Hollywood Child" by Home
 “Fantastic Voyage” by Coolio
 "Fat Boys Can't Make It in Santa Monica" by Nitty Gritty Dirt Band
 "Feedback On Highway 101" by Van Morrison
 "Fifth and Vine" by Livingston Taylor
 "Fire Escape" by Foster the People
 "Fireworks: A Celebration of Los Angeles" by Jerry Goldsmith
 "First of the Gang to Die" by Morrissey
 "Flight To Hollywood" by Crazy Gang
 "Florence Avenue" by The Nite Walkers
 "Flowers" by Miley Cyrus
 "Fluffy Goes to Hollywood" by Susan And God
 "Fly with Me to Malibu" by Ricky King
 "Foggy Day in Hollywood" by Alex Masi
 "For L.A." by Ill Brothers
 "For the Movies" by Buckcherry
 "For What It's Worth" by Buffalo Springfield
 "Forest Lawn" by Tom Paxton
 "Forgotten (Lost angels) by Lamb of God
 "Fortress Disneyland" by Trench Fever
 "Fountain and Fairfax" by Afghan Whigs
 "Fountain Avenue" by Albert Hammond
 "Fourth and Main" by Jackson Browne
 "France To L.A." by The Touch Funk
 "Free Fallin'" by Tom Petty and the Heartbreakers
 "Free in L.A." by Bolland & Bolland
 "Freedom '91" by New Model Army
 "Freeway Flyer" by Jan and Dean
 "Freeway Time in L.A. County Jail" by Sublime
 "The Freeways of L.A." by Mack and Jamie
 "The Fresh Prince of Bel-Air" by Will Smith
 "From Chicago to L.A." by Shakane
 "From Denver to L.A ." by Elton John
 "From Great Britain to L.A." by Albert Hammond
 "From Here to L.A." by BZN
 "From Here to L.A." by Early November
 "From L.A. to New Orleans (Broken Down Bus)" by The Detergents
 "From L.A. to the Bay" by Homicide
 "From New York to L.A." by Patsy Gallant
 "From N.Y. to L.A." by Frank K
 "From Shreveport to L.A." by Keni Thomas
 "From Silver Lake" by Jackson Browne 
 "Fuck Compton" by Tim Dog
 "Fuck Hollywood" by The Anti-Heros
 "F*** in L.A." by Amen
 "Funkin' Up Hollywood" by Frankie Crocker & the Heart and Soul Orchestra
 "Funky L.A." by Paul Humphrey And His Cool-Aid Chemists
 "Funky Stuff" by Kool & the Gang
 "Funky Westside" by Tone Lōc
 "Funtimes in Babylon" by Father John Misty
 "The Game Get Live" by The Game featuring JT
 "Gardner Junction" by Open Road
 "Garner in Hollywood" by Erroll Garner
 "Gatecrashing" by Living in a Box
 "G'Day L.A. (Pavlova)" by Rolf Harris
 "Get Me Out of Hollywood" by Randy Stonehill
 "Get Your Body!" by Adamski
 "Gettin' Jiggy Wit It" by Will Smith 
 "Ghost Of Hollywood" by Roy Kenner
 "The Ghosts of Beverly Drive" by Death Cab for Cutie
 "Giggin' Down 103rd" by Watts 103rd Street Rhythm Band
 "Gin and Juice" by Snoop Dogg
 "Girl from Malibu" by Red Elvises
 "The Girl from New York City" by The Beach Boys
 "Glam Slam" by Prince
 "Glamour Profession" by Steely Dan
 "Glendale Glide" by Meade Lux Lewis
 "Glendale Train" by New Riders of the Purple Sage
 "Glendora" by Rilo Kiley
 "Glory of the '80s" by Tori Amos
 "Girl on TV" by Lyte Funky Ones
 "Girls, Girls, Girls" by Mötley Crüe
 "Girls Girls Girls" by Sailor
 "(Go to Hell in) Hollywood" by The Lewd
 "Goblin" by Tyler the Creator
 "God Is a Bullet" by Concrete Blonde
 "Going Back to Cali" by LL Cool J
 "Going Back to Cali" by The Notorious B.I.G.
 "Going Back To L.A." by Johnny Otis
 "Going to California" by Led Zeppelin
 "Goin' Down in Hollywood" by Tim Rose
 "Goin' Down (On the Road to L.A.)" by Terry Black & Laurel Ward
 "Goin' Hollywood" by Kenny Hollis
 "Goin' Out to Hollywood" by Bill Emerson
 "Goin' Out West" by Tom Waits
 "Goin' Over Coldwater Canyon" by Gary Farr
 "Goin' to L.A." by The Hitchhikers
 "Goin' to L.A." by The Mighty Flea featuring Mickey Baker
 "Goin' to Malibu" by The Malibooz
 "Going to Malibu" by The Mountain Goats
 "Going Hollywood" by Bing Crosby
 "Going to L.A." by Peter Frampton
 "Going to Live in L.A." by Roger Waters
 "Gold" by John Stewart
 "Golden Days of Hollywood" by Harpo Squeaks
 "Gone Country" by Alan Jackson
 "Gone Hollywood" by John Wesley Harding (singer)
 "Gone Hollywood" by Point Blank (band) 
 "Gone Hollywood" by Supertramp
 "Good for My Money" by Baby Bash
 "Goodbye Hollywood" by JET
 "Goodbye Hollywood" by Richard Marx
 "Goodbye L.A." by Bob Segarini
 "Goodbye L.A." by Joe Beck
 "Goodbye L.A." by Rick Castle
 "Goodbye to L.A." by Robbie Dupree
 "Goodnight Hollywood" by Tino Casal
 "Goodnight Hollywood Blvd" by Ryan Adams
 "Goodnight L.A." by Counting Crows
 "Goodnight L.A." by Ron Mahonin
 "Goodnight L.A." by Strangeways
 "Good Time Charlie's Got the Blues" by Danny O'Keefe
 "Gone Hollywood" by Bob James
 "Gone Hollywood" by Point Blank
 "Gone Hollywood" by Supertramp
 "Got to Get Back to L.A." by Barbara Morrison
 "Got to Get Back to Pasadena" by Gavin Du Porter
 "Gotta Lotta Love" by Ice-T
 "Gotta Make It to L.A." by Dale Anderson
 "Grape Street Anthem" by Grape Street Cripps
 "The Great Airplane Strike" by Paul Revere & the Raiders
 "The Great Los Angeles Flood" by Woody Guthrie
 "Grey in LA" by Loudon Wainwright III
 "Grey L.A." by Blackbear
 "Growing Up in Hollywood Town" by Lincoln Mayorga & Amanda McBroom
 "GTO" by Ronny & the Daytonas
 "Gunfight on Malibu Beach" by Pajama Slave Dancers

H–K
 "The Haircut Song" by Ray Stevens
 "Halfway to Hollywood" by Sensible Gray Cells
 "Hancock Park (La Brea Tar Pits)" by Joy
 "Hand It to Hollywood" by We Found a Lovebird
 "Hand Of the Dead Body" by Scarface (rapper) featuring Ice Cube
 "Hangin' Out In Hollywood" by Betty Davis
 "Happy (Hollywood Symphony)" by Mike Smith (Dave Clark Five) And Mike D'Abo
 "Happy in Hollywood" by David Batteau
 "Harbor Freeway" by Jack Wilson
 "Hard Times in El Barrio" by Jose Feliciano
 "Harley to Hollywood" by Ambisonic
 "Harry Hippie" by Bobby Womack
 "Hate This Town" by Noah Reid
 "Heartattack and Vine" by Tom Waits
 "Heart of Gold" by Neil Young
 "Heart Of Hollywood" by Mike Greene
 "The Heart of Rock 'n' Roll" by Huey Lewis and the News 
 "Heaven" by Warrant
 "Hell Looks a Lot Like L.A." by Less Than Jake
 "Hello America" by Def Leppard
 "Hello, Brooklyn" by All Time Low
 "Hello Hollywood" by Mac Davis
 "Hello L.A. Bye Bye Birmingham" by Mac Davis
 "Hello, Los Angeles" by Steve Lawrence
 "Here I Am in Hollywood" by Red Elvises
 "Here in L.A." by Filmstars
 "Here in L.A." by Take 6
 "Hermosa Skyline" by David Benoit
 "Hey L.A." by Ryan Beatty
 "High Rollers" by Ice-T
 "High School U.S.A. (Los Angeles Area)" by Tommy Facenda
 "High Voltage" by Eagles of Death Metal
 "High Wind In Hollywood" by Howard McGhee Sextet
 "Highway 1" by B. W. Stevenson 
 "Highway 1" by Southwind
 "Highway 1" by Toby Tobias
 "Highway 101" by Groove Armada
 "Highway 101" by Jimmy McCracklin
 "Highway 101" by John Barry
 "Highway 101" by Social Distortion
 "Highway Number 101 (Pacific Coast Highway)" by Monk Higgins
 "Highway 5" by Afterglow
 "Highway 5" by American Music Club
 "Highway 5" by The Blessing
 "Highway Number 101 (Pacific Coast Highway)" by Monk Higgins
 "Highway One" by B. W. Stevenson
 "Hijack to Hollywood" by Flotsam Jetsam
 "Hillbilly Hollywood" by Nitty Gritty Dirt Band
 "Hills" by Kim Petras feat. Baby E
 "Hills Of Covina" by Corky Carroll & Chris Darrow
 "Hills Of Sylmar" by John McEuen
 "The Hippest Cat In Hollywood" by Horace Silver
 "History Lesson Part 2" by Minutemen
 "Hit City L.A." by Rosie Flores
 "Hit 'Em Up" by 2Pac
 "Hitchcock Railway" by Joe Cocker
 "Hive" by Earl Sweatshirt  featuring Vince Staples & Casey Veggies
 "Holiday from Real" by Jack's Mannequin
 "Holiday in Disneyland" by Dalek I Love You
 "Holiday In Hollywood" by Richard Stepp
 "Holiday Rap" by MC Miker G & DJ Sven
 "Hollerin' at the Watkins" by Harry Edison
 "Hollis to Hollywood" by LL Cool J
 "Hollyhood" by Helen Bruner & Terry Jones
 "Holly Jolly Hollywood" by The Wedding Present
 "Hollyweird" by Poison
 "Hollywierd, USX" (from the original soundtrack of the film 'Eating Raoul')
 "Holly Wood" by Claudia Hart
 "Holly Wood Died" by Yellowcard
 "Holly-Wood-If-She-Could" by Bootsy Collins
 "Holly Wood Ya" by Enuff Z'nuff
 "Hollywood" by 999
 "Hollywood" by Adele Bertei
 "Hollywood" by Adler's Appetite
 "Hollywood" by Aim
 "Hollywood" by Alabama
 "Hollywood" by Alternate Routes
 "Hollywood" by America
 "Hollywood" by Ariel
 "Hollywood" by Angus and Julia Stone
 "Hollywood" by B.B.E.
 "Hollywood" by Beano
 "Hollywood" by Benedict Arnold and the Traitors
 "Hollywood" by Bernd Clüver
 "Hollywood" by Bliss Band
 "Hollywood" by Blood, Sweat & Tears
 "Hollywood" by Boz Scaggs
 "Hollywood" by Billy Squier
 "Hollywood" by Brigitte Fontaine
 "Hollywood" by Brooklyn
 "Hollywood" by Carl Davis
 "Hollywood" by Charles Beverly
 "Hollywood' by Chet Baker & Bud Shank
 "Hollywood" by Chico And Cha Cha
 "Hollywood" by Chris Hodge
 "Hollywood" by Cluster
 "Hollywood" by Collective Soul
 "Hollywood" by Connie Francis
 "Hollywood" by The Cranberries
 "Hollywood" by Crocodile Harris
 "Hollywood" by Crowfoot
 "Hollywood" by The Crusaders
 "Hollywood" by Crystal Gayle
 "Hollywood" by Dalbello
 "Hollywood" by Dave Kusworth
 "Hollywood" by David McNeil
 "Hollywood" by Demon
 "Hollywood" by Dingo
 "Hollywood" by Daniel Powter
 "Hollywood" by Dolly Dots
 "Hollywood" by Elliott Murphy
 "Hollywood" by Fargo (band)
 "Hollywood" by Filthy Lucre
 "Hollywood" by Freddie James
 "Hollywood" by G Wayne Thomas
 "Hollywood" by Gardner & Boult
 "Hollywood" by Gene Page
 "Hollywood" by George Clinton
 "Hollywood" by Gerard Kenny
 "Hollywood" by Gerardo
 "Hollywood" by Glee Club
 "Hollywood" by Glen Dale
 "Hollywood" by Gruppo Sportivo
 "Hollywood" by Guy Clark
 "Hollywood" by Hayride
 "Hollywood" by Howard Boggess
 "Hollywood" by Indra
 "Hollywood" by Jackie Trent
 "Hollywood" by Jameson Booker
 "Hollywood" by Jeremy Gluck
 "Hollywood" by Jimmy Holiday
 "Hollywood" by Joe Raymond
 "Hollywood" by John Carpenter
 "Hollywood" by Johnny Logan
 "Hollywood" by Jonas Brothers
 "Hollywood" by Junkyard
 "Hollywood" by Katie
 "Hollywood" by Koreana (band)
 "Hollywood" by Larry Lee
 "Hollywood" by Lauren Wood
 "Hollywood" by Lee Ann Womack
 "Hollywood" by Lena Valaitis
 "Hollywood" by Lisa Dal Bello
 "Hollywood" by Lucinda Sieger
 "Hollywood" by Luna
 "Hollywood" by Luniz
 "Hollywood" by Machine Gun Fellatio
 "Hollywood" by Madonna
 "Hollywood" by Marc Hunter
 "Hollywood" by Marina & the Diamonds
 "Hollywood" by Mart Featuring Casey 
 "Hollywood" by Michael Bublé
 "Hollywood" by Micky Skeel
 "Hollywood" by The Monkees (covered by author Michael Nesmith)
 "Hollywood" by Moodie
 "Hollywood" by Nutcase
 "Hollywood" by Orchestre des Champs-Élysées
 "Hollywood" by P.O.D.
 "Hollywood" by Patty Larkin
 "Hollywood" by Peroxide
 "Hollywood" by Peter Foldy
 "Hollywood" by Pink Floyd (from the original soundtrack of the 1969 film More)
 "Hollywood" by Positive Boredom
 "Hollywood" by Praga Khan
 "Hollywood" by Ray Camacho Band
 “Hollywood” by Red Julia
 "Hollywood" by The Red Krayola
 "Hollywood" by Rene Simard
 "Hollywood" by Rex Allen Jr.
 "Hollywood" by Rick James
 "Hollywood" by Rich Dodson
 "Hollywood" by The Ring
 "Hollywood" by Robert Bradley's Blackwater Surprise
 "Hollywood" by Robert Russell Bennett
 "Hollywood" by Ruby
 "Hollywood" by Rufus with Chaka Khan
 "Hollywood" by The Runaways
 "Hollywood" by Sandy Coast
 "Hollywood" by the Searchers
 "Hollywood" by Sho Nuff
 "Hollywood" by Shooting Star
 "Hollywood" by Silverchair
 "Hollywood" by Skyband
 "Hollywood" by Sleaze
 "Hollywood" by Stanley Clarke
 "Hollywood" by Statler Brothers
 "Hollywood" by Streetheart
 "Hollywood" by Supermax
 "Hollywood" by Suzi Quatro
 "Hollywood" by Thelma Houston
 "Hollywood" by Thunderclap Newman
 "Hollywood" by Tierra
 "Hollywood" by Tim McIntire
 "Hollywood" by Towers Of London
 "Hollywood" by Trevor Watts & Veryan Weston
 "Hollywood" by The Turnarounds & The Stingers
 "Hollywood" by UK Subs
 "Hollywood" by Video Kids
 "Hollywood" by The Wallflowers
 "Hollywood" by Walter Martino
 "Hollywood" by Waterloo & Robinson
 "Hollywood" by West Indian Girl
 "Hollywood" by World Party
 "Hollywood" by Zon
 "Hollywood 1923" by Salvation
 "Hollywood 2001" by Hollywood
 "Hollywood 4-5-92" by American Music Club
 "Hollywood (26 25 24)" by Main Street
 "Hollywood A Go-Go" by Los Persuaders
 "Hollywood Actor" by The Jaynells
 "The Hollywood Agent" by Teddy & Darrel
 "Hollywood Affair" by Iggy Pop & Johnny Depp
 "Hollywood Aimee" (from the musical Scandalous: The Life and Trials of Aimee Semple McPherson)
 "Hollywood (Africa)" by The Red Hot Chili Peppers
 "Hollywood & Vine" by The Dell-Vikings
 "Hollywood & Vine" by Kim Morrison
 "Hollywood & Vine" by Lew Brown 
 "Hollywood & Vine" by Richie Alhona
 "Hollywood & Vine" by Samantha 7
 "Hollywood & Vine" by Susan Raye
 "Hollywood and Wine" by Gary S. Paxton 
 "Hollywood and Wine" by Rhino Bucket
 "Hollywood and Wine (I Wish I Had a Bottle of)" by Rodney Lay
 "Hollywood at Vine" by Joe Sanders & his Orchestra 
 "Hollywood Babies" by David Blue
 "Hollywood Baby" by Lambert and Nuttycombe
 "Hollywood Baby" by The Packers
 "Hollywood Baby Sitter" by Eddie Brandt And His Hollywood Hicks
 "Hollywood Baby Too" by Win (band)
 "Hollywood Babylon" by Ian North
 "Hollywood Babylon" by The Misfits
 "Hollywood (Bande Des Cines)" by Jean Claudric
 "Hollywood Bass Player" by Josh Rouse
 "Hollywood Bazaar" by Georgie Auld
 "Hollywood Be Thy Name" by Dr John
 "Hollywood Bed" by The Blasters
 "Hollywood Beyond" by Hollywood Beyond
 "Hollywood Big Time" by Yvonne Wilkins 
 "Hollywood Bitch" by Stone Temple Pilots
 "Hollywood Blues" by Boz Scaggs
 "Hollywood Blues" by Hank Crawford
 "Hollywood Blues" by Marcella Detroit
 "Hollywood Blues" by Thijs Van Leer
 "Hollywood Blues" by Woody Herman & His Orchestra
 "Hollywood Boogie" by Pete Johnson
 "Hollywood Boogie" by Soundie
 "Hollywood Blvd." by Neil Merryweather
 "Hollywood Blvd." by Sky Sunlight Saxon/Fire Wall
 "Hollywood Boulevard" by American Noise
 "Hollywood Boulevard" by Big Audio Dynamite
 "Hollywood Boulevard" by Gino Cunico
 "Hollywood Boulevard" by L.A. Dream Team Featuring Michael Winslow
 "Hollywood Boulevard" by Ray Parker Jr.
 "Hollywood Boulevard" by Tina Arena
 "Hollywood Boulevard" by Two of Us (Band)
 "Hollywood Bound" by Freddie Simmons Quintette
 "Hollywood Bound" by Nick Mozingo
 "Hollywood Bowl" by Band of Skulls
 "Hollywood Bowl" by Paradox
 "Hollywood Bowl" by Tony Pastor (bandleader)
 "Hollywood Boy" by Bungie Chords
 "The Hollywood Brats" by Rococo
 "Hollywood Bump" by Redwing
 "Hollywood, California" (from the musical 'The Act')
 "Hollywood Calypso" by Josephine Premice
 "Hollywood Cantata" by Grateful Dead
 "Hollywood Canteen" from Hollywood Canteen (film)
 "Hollywood Cat" by Trig Richards
 "Hollywood Cats" by Ray Campi
 "Hollywood Cha-Cha" by Ava Von Hollywood
 "Hollywood Circles" by Brooklyn Dreams
 "Hollywood City" by Carl Perkins
 "Hollywood City" by Claude Morgan (member of Bimbo Jet)
 "Hollywood City" by Midnight Gang
 "Hollywood City" by Zinc
 "Hollywood Clothes" by Don Bowman
 "Hollywood Cowboy" by Milt Hult-Berg
 "Hollywood Cowboys" by Tiny Tim
 "Hollywood Dance" by B*tch
 "Hollywood Dancers" by Sundance
 "Hollywood Darling" by H.P. Riot
 "Hollywood Daydream" by La Machine De Rêve (featuring Donna De Lory)
 "Hollywood (Disco Star)" by Sweet Dreams
 "Hollywood Distractions" by Phantom, Rocker & Slick
 "Hollywood Divorce" by Outkast with Snoop Dogg & Lil Wayne
 "Hollywood (Down On Your Luck)" by Thin Lizzy
 "Hollywood (Dragnet)" by Fabulous Poodles
 "Hollywood Dream" by H2O
 "Hollywood Dream" by James Gang
 "Hollywood Dream" by Je Frenchie
 "Hollywood Dream" by Spirit
 "Hollywood Dream" by Thunderclap Newman
 "Hollywood Dream Trip" by Syrinx
 "Hollywood Dreaming" by Father's Children
 "Hollywood Dreams" by Excalibur
 "Hollywood Dreams" by Giorgio Moroder
 "Hollywood Dreams" by John Stewart
 "Hollywood Dreams" by Jon Bon Jovi
 "Hollywood Dreams" by Partners In Crime
 "Hollywood Drive" by Red Callender
 "Hollywood Ellegies" by Bill Pritchard
 "Hollywood En Plywood" by Aut'Chose
 "Hollywood Ending" by Abi Tucker
 "Hollywood Ending" by	The Fabulous Farquahr
 "Hollywood Ending" by Good Rats
 "Hollywood Ending" by Right Said Fred
 "Hollywood Ending" by Sleater-Kinney
 "Hollywood Faces" by Joe Hinton & Big Dee Ervin
 "Hollywood Fade" by Dave Tofani
 "Hollywood Flanger" by Space Art
 "Hollywood Flashback" by Amanda Lear
 "Hollywood Forever" by Jean Claudric
 "Hollywood Forever" by L.A. Guns
 "Hollywood Forever Cemetery Sings" by Father John Misty
 "Hollywood...Forty Years Ago" by Paradise Birds
 "Hollywood Freaks" by Beck
 "Hollywood Freeway" by Dennis Weaver
 "Hollywood Fun" by Dick Hyman
 "Hollywood Gem" by Long Fin Killie
 "Hollywood Girl" by Blind Date
 "Hollywood Girl" By Drake Bell
 "Hollywood Girl" by Jeffrey Steele
 "Hollywood Girls" by Barnfather 
 "Hollywood Girls" by Swanee
 "Hollywood Hallucination" by Michael Quatro
 "Hollywood Hat" by Tommy Dorsey
 "Hollywood Hates You" by All The Madmen
 "Hollywood Heart" by Keats
 "Hollywood Heartache" by The Bellamy Brothers
 "Hollywood Heartbeat" by Carmine Appice
 "Hollywood Heaven" by Jeremy Dormouse
 "Hollywood Heavy" by Neil Merryweather
 "Hollywood Heckle and Jive" by England Dan and John Ford Coley
 "Hollywood Hell Driver" by Chosen People Band
 "Hollywood Hero" by Sham 69
 "Hollywood Heroes" by Hunter Cain
 "Hollywood Heroes" by Ian Page
 "Hollywood Heroes" by John Schneider
 "Hollywood Herv" by Peddler
 "Hollywood High" by The Mirrors
 "Hollywood Hillbilly" by Dale Watson
 "Hollywood Hills" by Beat Farmers
 "Hollywood Hills" by Randy Fuller
 "Hollywood Hills" by Sunrise Avenue
 "Hollywood Holiday" by Gino Vannelli
 "Hollywood Holiday" by Richard Stepp
 "Hollywood Holiday" by True West
 "Hollywood Hollyweird" by Margareta Svensson
 "Hollywood (Holly Would)" by Penny DeHaven
 "Hollywood Hollywood" by Lou & The Hollywood Bananas
 "Hollywood Honey" by Readymades
 "Hollywood Honeys" by Hank Williams Jr.
 "Hollywood Honeys" by Southwind
 "Hollywood Hong Kong Swing" by Cruella De Ville
 "Hollywood Hop" by Earl Hines
 "Hollywood Hop" by Sam Donahue And His Swing Seven
 "Hollywood Hopeful" by Loudon Wainwright III
 "Hollywood Hot" by The Eleventh Hour
 "Hollywood Hotel" by Lo Budget And The Raincoats 
 "Hollywood Hotel" by Ray Henderson
 "Hollywood Hump" by Ohio Players
 "Hollywood Humpty Dumpty" by Mac Davis
 "Hollywood (I Got It)" by Palma Violets
 "Hollywood, I'm Coming" by Twiztid
 "Hollywood Intermission" by Never Never Band
 "Hollywood Is Dead" by Antena
 "Hollywood Is High" by Violent Femmes
 "Hollywood Is Just a Dream When You're Seventeen" by Amanda Lear
 "Hollywood It's Me" by RB Greaves
 "Hollywood Joe" by Daniel Moore
 "Hollywood Joe" by Spencer Davis
 "Hollywood Jump" by Lester Young & Count Basie
 "Hollywood (Just Ain't No Place)" by Lee Hazlewood
 "Hollywood Kids" by Bolland & Bolland
 "Hollywood Kids" by The Thrills
 "Hollywood Killer" by Tigertailz
 "Hollywood Kings" by Clean, Athletic And Talented
 "Hollywood Kiss" by Emerson Drive
 "Hollywood Kisses" by Kung Fu
 "Hollywood Kisses" by Peter Beethoven
 "Hollywood Knights" by Brooklyn Dreams
 "Hollywood Lady" by Demis Roussos
 "Hollywood Lament" by Saint & Stephanie
 "Hollywood Landmines" by Paradise Motel
 "Hollywood Legends" by Bruno Bertoli
 "Hollywood Liar" by Grace Jones
 "Hollywood Love" by Carroll Baker
 "Hollywood Love Affair" by Hollywood Love Affair
 "Hollywood (Love, I Found Out Today You Care)" by Everett 'Blood' Hollins 
 "Hollywood Magic" by EGBA
 "Hollywood Maids" by Thrashing Doves
 "Hollywood Mambo" by Tony Martinez Quintet
 "Hollywood Mecca of the Movies" by T-Bone Burnett
 "Hollywood Millionaire" by The Werewolves
 "Hollywood Minds" by White Limbo
 "Hollywood Mom" by BBB
 "Hollywood Montage" (from the film Hollywood Inn)
 "Hollywood Moon" by P. F. Sloan
 "Hollywood Movie" by Silver Convention
 "Hollywood Movie Girls" by Dusty Springfield
 "Hollywood Mystery" by Smoke Blow
 "Hollywood Never Forgives" by Mark Mulcahy
 "Hollywood Nightmare" by Bram Tchaikovsky
 "Hollywood Nights" by AJ Karmen
 "Hollywood Nights" by Bob Seger
 "Hollywood Nights" by CC Catch
 "Hollywood Nights" by Casino Steel
 "Hollywood Nights" by Marcel King
 "Hollywood Nights" by Paul Kendrick
 "Hollywood Nights" by Rob Strong
 "Hollywood Nite Life" by Tony, Vic & Manuel
 "Hollywood Nites" by Lance Romance
 "Hollywood Nocturne" by Brian Setzer Orchestra
 "Hollywood Nostalgie" by Rod Hunter
 "Hollywood Odyssey" by Yves Montand
 "Hollywood (Oh La La)" by Titanic (band)
 "Hollywood Or Bust" by Dean Martin
 "Hollywood Or Bust" by Wrathchild
 "Hollywood Parade" by Ian Tamblyn
 "Hollywood Paradise" by Henry Paul Band
 "Hollywood, Park Avenue and Broadway" music by Ray Henderson; lyrics by Lew Brown
 "Hollywood Party" by Dick Bush
 "Hollywood Party" by Fred Ventura
 "Hollywood Party" (from the film 'Hollywood Party')
 "Hollywood Party" by Mighty Mouth
 "Hollywood Party (Getting High)" by Brooklyn Express
 "Hollywood Pastime" by Jimmy Dorsey and his Orchestra
 "Hollywood Polka" by Harmony Bells Orchestra
 "Hollywood Polka" by Matt Lebar
 "Hollywood Potters" by Dolly Parton
 "Hollywood Pretenders" by Euro-K
 "Hollywood Queen" by John Miles
 "Hollywood Rock'n'Roll" by Jon Lord
 "The Hollywood Role" by Ali Thomson
 "Hollywood Romance" by Lynsey De Paul
 "Hollywood Scandal - Fatty Arbuckle" by Carl Davis
 "Hollywood Scene" by Andraé Crouch
 "Hollywood Seven" by Jon English
 "Hollywood Sheik" by Sue Wilkinson
 "Hollywood Shuffle" by Brighton Rock (band)
 "Hollywood Shuffle" by Norbert Saric's B.O.B.S. featuring Ernie Watts, Noel McCalla 
 "Hollywood Shuffle" by Richard M. Jones
 "Hollywood Sign" by Peter Sarstedt
 "Hollywood Signs" by Exene Cervenka
 "Hollywood Signs" by Ph.D.
 "Hollywood Situation" by The Hudson Brothers
 "Hollywood Slim" by Sex Gang Children
 "Hollywood Smiles" by Glen Campbell
 "Hollywood (So Far, So Good)" by Warrant
 "Hollywood Song" by Don Agrati (aka Don Grady)
 "Hollywood Special" by Axel Zwingenberger 
 "Hollywood Square" by Hollywood Squares
 "Hollywood Square Dance" by Dick Jurgens
 "Hollywood Squares" by Bootsy's Rubber Band
 "Hollywood Squares" by Dillinger Escape Plan & Mike Patton
 "Hollywood Squares" by Enuff Z'nuff
 "Hollywood Squares" by George Strait
 "Hollywood Squares" by Ron Anderson
 "Hollywood Stampede" by Coleman Hawkins
 "Hollywood Star" by The Balloons
 "Hollywood Star" by Jerry Fuller
 "Hollywood Star" by O.B. McClinton
 "Hollywood Star" by Rick James
 "Hollywood Star (Hooray For Hollywood)" by Marc Tanner Band
 "Hollywood (State of Mind)" by The Variations
 "Hollywood Still Burning" by Bill Nelson
 "Hollywood Story" (from Best Foot Forward (musical))
 "Hollywood Streetwalker" by William Bell
 "Hollywood Stroll" by Vik E Lee
 "Hollywood Style" by Nicodemus (musician)
 "Hollywood Sunset" by Parchment
 "Hollywood, Sunset And Vine" by Lincoln Chase
 "Hollywood Superstar" by Andy Martin
 "Hollywood Swingin'" by Kool & the Gang
 "Hollywood Swings" by Teddy & Darrel
 "Hollywood Symphony" by Holger Czukay
 "Hollywood Tease" by L.A. Guns
 "Hollywood Ten O' Clock at Night" by Barrabás
 "Hollywood (The Love You Steal)" by The Radiators (Australian band)
 "Hollywood the Second Time" by Wall of Voodoo
 "Hollywood To Hollywood" by Wyclef Jean
 "Hollywood To Memphis" by Doug Kershaw
 "Hollywood Tonight" by Michael Jackson
 "Hollywood Town" By Harriet Schock & Manfred Mann's Earth Band
 "Hollywood Trash" by King Kobra
 "The Hollywood Twist" by Si Zentner & His Orchestra
 "Hollywood Twist" by Thunder Rocks
 "Hollywood Twist" by Werner Baumgart And His Music Mixers
 "Hollywood U.S.A" by Jim Pewter
 "Hollywood U.S.A" by RuPaul
 "Hollywood Walk" by Tom Scott
 "Hollywood Waltz" by Buck Owens
 "Hollywood Way" by Birds Of A Feather
 "Hollywood Wives" by Me Me Me (featured Alex James (musician) & Stephen Duffy)
 "Hollywood Women" by The Refreshments (Swedish band)
 "Hollywood (You Kiss While You're Dancing)" by Telephone Bill and the Smooth Operators
 "Hollywoodland" by Venice (band)
 "Hollywoodschaukel" by Ixi
 "Hollywood's a Funny Place" from Hollywood Pinafore
 "Hollywood's Bleeding" by Post Malone
 "Hollywood's Burning" by L.A. Guns
 "Hollywood's Dream" by Jeff Thomas
 "Hollywood's My Stop" by Lou Christie
 "Hollywood Horror" by Dropout 
 "Hollywood's Not America" by Ferras
 "Hollywould" by Betty Wright
 "Holly Would" by April Wine
 "Holly Would" by The Crickets
 "Holly Would" by Fat City
 "Holly Would" by Gary Richrath
 "Holly Would" by Jackie DeShannon
 "Holly (Would You Turn Me On?) by All Time Low
 "Holly-Wuud" by Miles Davis
 "Holocaust On Sunset Boulevard" by Rodney And The Brunettes (Rodney is Rodney Bingenheimer)
 "The Holy Man on Malibu Bus Number Three" by Dory Previn
 "Holy Wood" by Anvil
 "Home in Pasadena" by Al Jolson
 "Home Is Where the Heart Is" by Gladys Knight and the Pips
 "Home to L.A." by Kyle
 "Honey Don't Leave L.A." by James Taylor
 "Honolulu Baby" by Laurel and Hardy
 "Honky Tonk Heroes from Hollywood" by Donnie Rohrs
 "Hood Gone Love It" by Jay Rock
 "Hooked on Hollywood" by Gary Glitter
 "Hooray for Hollywood" (from the film 'Hollywood Hotel')
 "Hooray for Hollywood" by David Soul
 "Hooray for LA" by Juliana Hatfield with Some Girls on album Crushing Love
 "Hoover Street" by Brazzaville
 "Hoover Street" by Rancid
 "Hoover Street" by ScHoolboy Q
 "Hot Box City" by Klaatu
 "Hot Fudge (Moving to L.A.)" by Robbie Williams
 "Hot Hollywood Eyes" by Jaam Bros.
 "Hot Hollywood Nights" by Bizarre
 "Hot Line To L.A." by XYZ 
 "Hot Love" by Shakespears Sister
 "Hot Malibu Nights" by Laurie Marshall
 "Hotel California" by Eagles
 "Hotdogs and Hamburgers" by John Cougar Mellencamp
 "Hotel Roosevelt" by Augustana
 "Hot'lanta" by 38 Special
 "Hot Rod Lincoln" by Charlie Ryan
 "Hot Rod Race" by Arkie Shibley
 "House On Elm Street" by Harold Johnson Sextet
 "The House On Highland Avenue" by Gun Club
 "How Much Is It Worth to Live in L.A" by Waylon Jennings
 "How to Survive in South Central" by Ice Cube
 "Hundsbichler In Hollywood" by Peter Wolf (producer)
 "Huxley in Hollywood" by Love Camp 7
 "Hyperion and Sunset" by Grant Lee Buffalo
 "Hypest From Cypress" by Mellow Man Ace
 "I-5" by The Penetrators
 "I-5" by Stevie B
 "I-5" by The Units
 "I Ain't New Ta This" by Ice-T 
 "I Am, I Said" by Neil Diamond
 "I Buy the Drugs" Electric Six
 "I Can't Stand LA" by Bowling For Soup
 "I Dig Rock and Roll Music" by Peter, Paul and Mary 
 "I Don't Know Nothing About Hollywood" by The Brakes
 "I Got it Goin' On" by Tone-Loc
 "I Gotta Go to L.A." by The Cribs
 "I Hate California" by Jonathan Coulton
 "I Have Peace" by Strike (band)
 "I Left My Wallet in El Segundo" by A Tribe Called Quest
 "I Like L.A." by The Intelligence
 "I Love America" by Patrick Juvet
 "I Love Cali" by Roscoe
 "I Love Hollywood" by Ashleigh Marsh
 "I Love L.A." by Randy Newman (Played after the L.A. Dodgers wins at Dodger Stadium, and after the L.A. Lakers win at the Staples Center)
 "I Love L.A." by Young Dre The Truth
 "I Love L.A." by Rilo Kiley
 "I Love L.A." by Brian McKnight
 "I Love L.A." by Henry Strogin
 "I Love L.A." by Skee-Lo
 "I Love LA" by Emblem3
 "I Love L.A." by Starcrawler
 "I Loved the Way She Said L.A." by Spitalfield
 "I Only Wanna See L.A." by Bogart Co.
 "I Remember L.A." by Celine Dion
 "I Remember Watts" by The Watts Prophets
 "I Rep That West" by Ice Cube
 "I Sang Dixie" by Dwight Yoakam
 "I See Hawks in L.A." by I see Hawks in L.A.
 "I Shot The Sheriff" by Warren G
 "I Slept in an Arcade" by Black Randy and the Metrosquad
 "I Wanna Be A Star (In La, La, La, La, Land)" by Howard Scott
 "I Wanna Go Back to Hollywood" by MFA Kera, Mike Russell, Eddie Harris
 "I Want to Go Home" by Holly and the Italians
 "I Want to Go to Hollywood" (from the musical Grand Hotel)
 "I Will Be in L.A. (Le Lundi Au Soleil)" by Patrick Juvet
 "I Wish" by Skee-Lo
 "I Wish I Was in L.A." by Al Roberts Jr.
 "I Woke Up L.A." by VAST
 "I'd Rather Be In L.A." by Gurney Anderson
 "If Hollywood Don't Need You (Honey I Still Do)" by Don Williams
 "If You Like the Music (Suicide and Vine)" by Stark & McBrien
 "I'll Meet You in L.A." by Lucifer's Friend
 "Il N'y a Plus D'Étoiles a Hollywood" by Salvatore Adamo
 "I'm Coming Home Los Angeles" by Jimmy Roselli
 "I'm Heading for L.A." by Johnny Devlin & Sailing
 "I'm in L.A. Bitch" by LMFAO
 "I'm from L.A." by Go Betty Go
 "(I'm On My Way) To Old L.A." by Jerry Palmer
 "I'm So L.A." by Mynx
 "I'm So Special" by French Montana
 "I'm Spending Hanukkah in Santa Monica" by Tom Lehrer
 "I'm Writing a Novel" by Father John Misty
 "In a Pasadena Garden" by Mr. "X", Ben Litchfield
 "In California" by Lisa Marr (covered by Neko Case)
 "In Da Hood" by 50 Cent
 "In Hollywood" by Dobie Gray
 "In Hollywood" by Errol Brown
 "In Hollywood" by Fifth Avenue Band
 "In Hollywood" by Ian Whitcomb
 "In Hollywood" by Kim Wilde
 "In Hollywood (Everybody Is A Star)" by Village People
 "In Hollywood Ist Der Puff Kapputt" by 3 Bessofskis
 "In L.A." by Delinquent Habits
 "In L.A." by Eddy Grant
 "In L.A." from the musical Fame
 "In L.A." by Mike Lawing
 "In Pasadena" by Gavin Du Porter
 "In the City of the Angels" by John Gary
 "In Your Atmosphere by John Mayer
 "Indian Disneyland" by JJ Light (Jim Stallings)
 "Information L.A." by Mary Lou Collins
 "Inglewood" by Dan Siegel
 "Inglewood Barz" by Lil' Hawk (hip hop)
 "Inglewood Swangin'" by Mack 10
 "In-N-Out (Animal Style)" by We The Kings
 "International Jet Set" by The Specials 
 "International Love" by Pitbull feat. Chris Brown
 "Internationally Known" by Grandmaster Melle Mel & The Furious Five
 "Interstate 5" by The Wedding Present
 "Interstate Highway 101" by Redbone (band)
 "Into the Airwaves" by Jack's Mannequin
 "Into the Hollywood Groove (Passengerz Mix)" by Madonna & Missy Elliott
 "Intro: A Million and One Questions/Rhyme No More" by Jay Z
 "Invented" by Jimmy Eat World
 "Is This The Way to Hollywood?" by James Freud
 "Isn't It Nice to Be Home Again" by James Taylor
 "It Ain't Necessarily Bird Avenue (Byrd Avenue)" by Spanky & Our Gang
 "It Don't Rain In Beverly Hills" by Dean & Britta
 "It Neva Rains" by Tyga
 "It Never Rains in Los Angeles" by Army of Freshmen
 "It Never Rains in Southern California" by Albert Hammond
 "It Never Snows in L.A." by Jimmy Osmond
 "It Was a Good Day" by Ice Cube
 "It'll Chew You Up and Spit You Out" by Concrete Blonde
 "It's a Beautiful Day" by The Beach Boys
 "It's A Compton Thing" by Compton's Most Wanted
 "(It's Just) The Way That You Love Me" by Paula Abdul
 "It's Just Work for Me" by Ry Cooder
 "It's Nice To Go Trav'ling" by Frank Sinatra
 "It's Raining Here in Long Beach" by Nitty Gritty Dirt Band
 "I've Been To Hollywood" by Dorothy Shay
 "I've Got A Rock 'n' Roll Heart" by Eric Clapton 
 "Jamming in L.A." by The Investigators
 "Jane Says" by Jane's Addiction
 "Japan to Paris in L.A." by The Red Krayola
 "Jenny I Read" by Concrete Blonde
 "Jesus In LA" by Alec Benjamin
 "Jesus of Hollywood" by The Jigsaw Seen
 "Jet Pilot" by System of a Down
 "Jewellers & Bums" by Joe Strummer
 "JFK to LAX" by Gang Starr
 "John & Betty Go to LA" by Duffo
 "Johnny B Goode in Hollywood" by Eddie Bell
 "Johny Hit and Run Paulene" by X
 "Join Me in L.A." by Warren Zevon
 "Jordan: The Comeback" by Prefab Sprout
 "Journey to Paramount" (from the musical 'Sunset Boulevard')
 "Jump Around" by House Of Pain
 "Junkyard In Malibu" by John Cipollina Nick Gravenites
 "Jus Lyke Compton" by DJ Quik
 "Just A Hollywood Star" by Rankarna
 "Just Another Day in Hollywood" (from Chaplin (2006 musical))
 "Just Another Day in L.A." by Spider Loc
 "Just Another Day In Old L.A." by The Zanies 
 "Just Tah Let U Know" by Eazy-E
 "Kalifornia" by Mos Def
 "Kamata Hollywood City" by Gun Club
 "Karma's Payment" by Modest Mouse
 "Karson Mks U Bounce" by Boo-Yaa T.R.I.B.E
 "The Kelly Affair" by Be Your Own Pet
 "Kentucky Avenue" by Tom Waits
 "Kid Charlemagne" by Steely Dan
 "The Kids" by Hollywood Undead
 "Killafornia" by Cypress Hill
 "Kill Hollywood Me" by Britta Persson
 "A Kind of Christmas Card" by Morten Harket
 "King Of Hollywood" by The Eagles
 "King Of Hollywood" by Withered Hand
 "Kings Road" by Tom Petty
 "The Krankies Go to Hollywood (Krankies Rap)" by The Krankies

L–M
 "L.A." by ALMADEN ©2019 (Songwriter/Composer Fidencio Reynosa; BMI-Broadcast Music Inc.)
 "L.A." by Aarons & Ackley
 "L.A." by Amy Macdonald
 "L.A." by Ana Johnsson
 "L.A." by Art Porter, Jr.
 "L.A." by Bama Band
 "L.A." by Bonfire
 "L.A." by Brent Faiyaz
 "L.A." by Britny Fox
 "L.A." by Butthole Surfers
 "L.A." by Cliff Bennett
 "L.A." by Cold 187um
 "L.A." by David Rudder
 "L.A." by Dolly Dots
 "L.A." by Downtown Drive
 "L.A." by Elliott Smith
 "L.A." by The Fall
 "L.A." by Fanzine
 "L.A." by Garry Hagger
 "L.A." by Georgio
 "L.A." by Goodie (from the album Call Me Goodie)
 "L.A." by The Ideals
 "L.A." by Jackie DeShannon
 "L.A." By Jerry Merritt and the Crowns
 "L.A." by Mel Torme
 "L.A." by Murs
 "L.A." by The Naked Brothers Band
 "L.A." by Neil Young
 "L.A." by Orange Bicycle
 "L.A." by Patent Pending
 "L.A." by Sad Cafe
 "L.A." by Super8 & Tab
 "L.A." by Supersax
 "L.A." by Thomas Jefferson Kaye
 "L.A." by Widespread Panic
 "L.A. 2018" by Cosmic Baby (alias of Harald Blüchel)
 "L.A. 26000" by Damn Sam The Miracle Man 
 "L.A. 4am" by Boom Crash Opera
 "L.A. After Dark" by Teddy Edwards Quartet
 "L.A. Against N.Y." by Mr Holiday featuring MC Miker G
 "L.A. Ain't No Great Place to Be" by Help She Can't Swim
 "L.A. & Back Again" by Grapefruit
 "L.A. Angel" by Chris Thomas King
 "L.A. Angels" by Jimmy Payne
 "L.A. at the End of the Day" by Seventh Avenue
 "L.A. Baby" by Jonas Brothers
 "L.A. Blues" by Bill Black's Combo
 "L.A. Blues" (from City of Angels) 
 "L.A. Blues" by Lightnin' Hopkins
 "L.A. Blues" by Sam Porter And The Singing Strings
 "L.A. Blues" by The Stooges
 "L.A. Blues" by Tom T. Hall
 "The L.A. Boogie Chase" by Big Joe Turner
 "L.A. Bound" by King Errisson
 "L.A. BOYZ" by Victoria Justice ft. Ariana Grande
 "L.A. Break Down (And Take Me In)" by Jack Jones, written by Larry Marks
 "L.A. Burning" by Enuff Z'nuff
 "L.A. By Bike" by Lee Ritenour
 "L.A. Calling" by Crystal Fighters
 "L.A. Catcher" by Keisa Brown
 "L.A. City" by Ahmad Jamal
 "L.A. Cemetery" by Lightbulb
 "L.A. City Lights" by Candy Dulfer
 "L.A. City Smog Blues" by Keith Green
 "L.A. City Style" by Crooked I
 "L.A. Confidential" by Blue Dream
 "L.A. Connection" by Rainbow
 "L.A. County" by Lyle Lovett
 "L.A. County Jail '59 C/S" by Geronimo Black
 "L.A. County Line" by Dennis Weaver
 "L.A. Cowboy" by Mentor Williams
 "L.A. Cut Off" by Glenn Hughes
 "L.A. Decorum" by Amen
 "L.A. Devotee" by Panic! at the Disco
 "L.A. Doga Beach" by Leningrad Cowboys
 "L.A. Donut Day" by Ann Magnuson
 "L.A. Dreamer" by Charlie
 "L.A. Dreams" by Dream Team
 "L.A. '86" by The Fauves
 "L.A. En Olympie/L.A. In Olympie" by Henri Seroka & Jacques Zegers
 "L.A. Existential" by Richard Niles
 "L.A. Explosion" by The Last
 "L.A. 59" by Elf
 "L.A. Fantasy" by Lemon D
 "L.A. Flight" by Jerry Gaskill
 "L.A. Freeway" by Guy Clark
 "L.A. Freeway" by Pete Moore
 "L.A. Freeway" by Western Union Band
 "L.A. Getaway" by Joel Scott-Hill, John Barbata & Chris Ethridge
 "L.A. Girl" by The Adolescents
 "L.A. Girls" by Johnny Solinger
 "L.A. Girls" by Jupiter Rising
 "L.A. Goodbye" by The Ides of March
 "L.A. Goodbye" by Secret Service
 "L.A. Hallucinations" by Carly Rae Jepsen
 "L.A. Highway" by The Rats
 "The L.A. of My Dreams" by Sony Holland
 "L.A. in the Sunshine" by Little River Band
 "L.A. Inflatable" by 10cc
 "L.A. International Airport" by David Frizzell
 "L.A. Is My Kind of Place" by Barry White
 "L.A. Is My Lady" by Frank Sinatra
 "L.A. Is Only a Movie" by Linda Purl
 "L.A. Is the Place" by N.W.A
 "L.A. Is Where It's Happening" by Dan Henderson
 "L.A. Isabella" by Bones
 "L.A. Jazz Song" by Booker T & The MG's
 "L.A. Jinx" by Slade
 "L.A. Juice" by The Wolfhounds
 "L.A. Jungle" by Arnie Rue
 "L.A. Kings Rap For Da Stanley Cup 2014" by Alexandra Case
 "LA LA" by Capone-N-Noreaga
 "L.A., L.A." by Funkmaster General
 "L.A. L.A." by Max Julian
 "L.A. L.A." by Stiv Bators
 "L.A. L.A." by Translator
 "L.A. Lady" by Angel
 "L.A. Lady" by Baby
 "L.A. Lady" by Brian Keith
 "L.A. Lady" by Dick St. Nicklaus
 "L.A. Lady" by John Dummer Blues Band
 "L.A. Lady" by Lee Hazlewood
 "L.A. Lady" by New Riders of the Purple Sage
 "Theme from 'L.A. Law'" by Mike Post
 "The L.A. Law Suite" by Mike Post
 "L.A. Lifestyle" by Design (ad hoc jazz band)
 "L.A. Light" by Wilton Felder
 "L.A. Lights" by Texas
 "L.A. (Los Angeles)" by Harpo
 "L.A. (Los Angeles)" by Orange Colored Sky
 "L.A. Love Affair" by Simon May
 "L.A. Love (la la)" by Fergie
 "L.A. Lover" by Hollywood Saxons
 "L.A. Low" by Vice Squad
 "L.A.M.C." by Tool
 "L.A. Magic" by L.A. Allstar Magic Band
 "L.A. Mamma" by Jim Stafford
 "L.A. Made Me" by Alexz Johnson
 "L.A. Meantime" by Feather
 "L.A. Memory Lane" by John L Sullivan
 "L.A. Memphis and Tyler Texas" by Dale Hawkins
 "L.A. Morning" by Graham Sacher
 "L.A. Murder Motel" by Poni Hoax
 "L.A. (My Town)" by Four Tops
 "L.A. Night" by Melody Stewart
 "L.A. Nights" by ATB
 "L.A. Nights" by Carl Palmer
 "L.A. Nights" by Yasuko Agawa
 "L.A. No Name" by Night Ranger
 "L.A. on My Mind" by BNQT
 "L.A.P.D." by Morten Hampenberg 
 "L.A.P.D." by Ill Wind
 "L.A.P.D." by L.A. Guns
 "L.A.P.D." by The Offspring
 "L.A.P.D." by Robert Stoddard
 "L.A. Phants Graveyard" by Bloodrock
 "L.A. Pink Filth" by Walter Gross
 "L.A. Plane" by Cher
 "L.A. Posse" by Breeze
 "L.A. Quake" by Sam Taylor
 "L.A. Rain" by The Mynabirds
 "L.A. Rain" by The Rose of Avalanche
 "L.A. Reggae" by Jeff Phillips & Heaven
 "L.A. Rendezvous" by Alquin
 "L.A. Rhythm" by RuPaul
 "L.A. Ride" by Tiesto
 "L.A. River" by E
 "L.A. River" by Rancid
 "L.A. River Lady" by Brazzaville
 "L.A. Rocks" by Y&T
 "L.A. Rush" by Jimmy Rabbitt and Renegade
 "L.A. Scenes" by Chick Corea
 "L.A. Serenade" by Livingston Taylor
 "L.A. Shakedown" by Down to the Bone
 "L.A. Shakedown" by Patrick Hernandez
 "L.A., Si Si" by Los Angeles City College Jazz Band
 "L.A. Sleaze" by The Reactors
 "L.A. Song" by Christian Kane
 "The L.A. Song" by Dave Barnes
 "L.A. Song" by Deconstruction
 "L.A. Song" by Fischerspooner
 "L.A. Song" by Marie Osmond
 "L.A. Song" by People Under The Stairs
 "L.A. Song" by Rain
 "L.A. Song Circle: L.A.- L.A. Breakdown - The Way It Was In L.A." by Mark Murphy
 "L.A. Song (Out of This Town)" by Beth Hart
 "L.A. Soul" by Johnny Lytle
 "L.A. Spiritual" by Midnight Flyer
 "L.A. State of Mind" by Melanie B
 "L.A. - Stavanger" by Frode Gjerstad Quartet 
 "L.A. Stomp" by The Performers
 "L.A. Stories" by Junie Morrison
 "L.A. Story (feat. Mike Posner)" by Sammy Adams
 "L.A. Story Part I (My Little Brother is Crazy)" by Murs
 "L.A. Story Part II (Freestyle - Tagbangerlude)" by Murs
 "L.A. Story Part III" by Murs featuring 427 & T.W.
 "L.A. Street Scene (It's A Jubilee)" by Donny Osmond
 "L.A. Strut" by Tom Blades
 "L.A. Style Theme" by L.A. Style
 "L.A. Sunset" by John Paul Young
 "L.A. Sunset" by Sadao Watanabe
 "L.A. Sunshine" by Skatt Brothers
 "L.A. Sunshine" by Sylvia
 "L.A. Sunshine" by War
 "L.A. Techno Gear" by Jennifer Love Hewitt
 "L.A. To Brooklyn" by T-Love
 "L.A. To Frisco - Four Eleven Flat" by Victims Of Chance
 "L.A. To Mexico" by Terry Melcher
 "L.A. to New Orleans" by Theodore Love
 "L.A. to The Moon" by Ronnie Milsap
 "L.A. Today" by Alex Gold Featuring Phil Oakey
 "L.A. Town" by Hoyt Axton
 "L.A. Trajectory" by Bruce Cale Orchestra featuring Ernie Watts
 "L.A. Turnaround" by Billy Joe Shaver
 "L.A. URA Mystery" by Japanther
 "L.A. - U.S.A." by Hollywood Spectrum
 "L.A. Underground" by Lee Ritenour
 "L.A. Vignette" by Blues Saraceno
 "L.A. Walk" by Nik Weston
 "L.A. Water" by Helmet
 "L.A. Woman" by Barry Ryan
 "L.A. Woman" by The Doors and covered by Billy Idol
 "L.A. Women Love Uncle Bud" by Boozoo Chavis 
 "L.A. X" by Good Brothers
 "L.A. You're a Killer" by Larry Gatlin
 "L.A. Zoom" by Stray
 "L.A.'s Knockin' On Your Door" by Luther Allison
 "La Bamba Rebelde" by Las Cafeteras
 "La Brea" by Les McCann
 "La Califusa" by Australian Crawl
 "La Cantina De Hollywood" by Bing Crosby And The Andrews Sisters
 "La Cienega Just Smiled" by Ryan Adams
 "LA DON'T LOOK GOOD ON U" by ASTN
 "La Femme De Los Angeles" by Richard Berry
 "La La Land" by Big Daddy Kane
 "La La Land" by Bryce Vine
 "La La Land" by Demi Lovato
 "La La Land" by DVBBS & Shaun Frank ft. Delaney Jane
 "La La Land" by The Go-Go's
 "La La Land" by Shihad
 "La Mirada" by Philip Michael Thomas
 "Ladera Heights" by T. S. Monk
 "Ladies" by Mantronix ('Sunset Strip')
 "Ladies of the Canyon" by Joni Mitchell
 "Ladies Night" by Kool & The Gang
 "Lady from Hollywood" by Eddie Howell 
 "The Lady from L.A." by Michael Crawford
 "Lady Godiva" by Peter and Gordon
 "The Lady's Paying" (from the musical 'Sunset Boulevard')
 "Lake Hollywood" by Stolen Identity
 "Lakewood and John Marshall Blues" by York Brothers
 "L'America" by The Doors
 "Land of La La" by Stevie Wonder
 "Las Virgines Road" by Tony Booth
 "LaSo Square (Are You Ready)" by LaSo (this features Joe Bataan)
 "Last Letter From L.A." by Flash Larue & Lizzy
 "Last Night in Hollywood" by Jon English
 "The Last Resort" by Eagles
 "Last Train to San Fernando" by Johnny Duncan & The Blue Grass Boys
 "Laurel Canyon" by Jackie DeShannon
 "Laurel Canyon" by Le Orme
 "Laurel Canyon" by Soho
 "Laurel Canyon" by Wayne Carson
 "Laurel Canyon Blvd" by Van Dyke Parks
 "Laurel Canyon Home" by John Mayall
 "Laurel Canyon Sky Song" by Larry McNeely
 "Lausd" by Jurassic 5
 "LAX" by Aesthetic Perfection
 "LAX" by Big D and the Kids Table
 "LAX" by Brazzaville
 "LAX" by Xzibit
 "LAX" by Snoop Dogg and Ice Cube
 "L.A.X Files" by The Game
 "LAX To LDN" by Pure Filth Sound
 "LAX to O'Hare" by The Academy Is...
 "Lazy Dayz" by Shwayze
 "LBC and the ING" by Mack 10 featuring Snoop Dogg
 "Le Chateau" by Nous Non Plus
 "Le Fantôme D'Hollywood" by Patrick Juvet
 "Left Coast Envy" by The Starting Line
 "Leaving California by Boys Like Girls
 "Leavin' L.A." by Brooks Anderson
 "Leaving L.A." by Deliverance
 "Leaving LA" by Father John Misty
 "Leaving LA" by Markus Schulz, Nikki Flores
 "Les Délices D'Hollywood" by Véronique Sanson
 "Let Me Back In" by Rilo Kiley
 "Let Me Ride" by Dr. Dre
 "Let's Dance Tonight" by Poco
 "Let's Get It On" by 2Pac
 "Let's Go All the Way" by Sly Fox
 "Let's Go Crazy" by Prince
 "Letter from L.A." by Chris Knox
 "Letter from L.A." by Tygers Of Pan Tang
 "Letter to L.A." by Joe Ely
 "Life" by Tommy Boyce & Bobby Hart
 "Life Beyond L.A." by Ambrosia
 "Life in California" by Ice Cube
 "Life in Hollywood" by Cry No More
 "Life in L.A." by Ariel Pink's Haunted Graffiti
 "Life in L.A." by The Touch Funk
 "Life in Laralay" by Love and Rockets
 "Life in the Fast Lane" by Eagles
 "Lights of L.A." by Shaun Nielsen
 "Lights of L.A." by Sonny Curtis
 "Like Hollywood, Humpty Dumpty" by Sly Roker & The Slick Connection (reggae)
 "Like They Say in L.A." by East L.A. Car Pool
 "Little Bit of L.A." by Skywalk
 "Little Green Apples" by Roger Miller 
 "Little Hollywood Girl" by the Crickets
 "Little Miss Red Riding Hood Surfer Queen Of Hollywood" by Jim Pewter
 "The Little Old Lady from Pasadena" by Jan and Dean
 "The Little Old Lady (That Hijacked a Bus to Hollywood)" by George Deaton
 "Little Pig, Little Pig" by Green Jello
 "Little Slut" by TRU
 "A Little Western Town Called Beverly Hills" by Dorothy Shay
 "Livin' In Hollywood" by The Dudek Finnigan Krueger Band (featuring Les Dudek, Mike Finnigan)
 "Livin' In L.A." by Tom Kubis
 “Livin’ In This World” by Guru
 "Living In L.A." by Craig Pruess
 "Living in L.A." by Silk and Lace
 "L-L-L-L-A" by Tommy Dorsey
 "Lobster And Scrimp" by Timbaland featuring Jay-Z 
 "Local 47 Blues" by Alan Brackett
 "Loc'd After Dark" by Tone-Loc
 "Loch AAngeles Monster" by The Starlings
 "Locked Up" by Stomper
 "London Bridge" by Newtrament
 "London Nights" by London Boys
 "London To L.A. (Ready To Roll)" by BB&P
 "Lonely Lady (In L.A.)" by Zenda Check
 "Lonesome L.A. Cowboy" by Peter Rowan
 "{Long} Beach Culture" by Thompson Twins
 "Long Beach Thang" by Domino
 "A Long December" by Counting Crows
 "Long-Haired Lover from Liverpool" by Little Jimmy Osmond
 "Long Legged Linda" by Status Quo
 "Long Way from L.A." by Canned Heat
 "Long Way to Hollywood" by Hank Williams Jr.
 "Long Way To L.A." by Jonathan Prem
 "Los Ageless" by St. Vincent
 "Los Angeleaze" by The Bambi Slam
 "Los Angelenos" by Rialto
 "Los Angeles" by Adema
 "Los Angeles" by Atmosphere
 "Los Angeles" by The Audition
 "Los Angeles" by Benjamin Biolay
 "Los Angeles" by The Bird and the Bee
 "Los Angeles" (not the one in South California, they got one in South Patagonia) by Frank Black
 "Los Angeles" by blink-182
 "Los Angeles" by The Brilliant Green
 "Los Angeles" by Bryce Vine
 "Los Angeles" by Buddy Hodge
 "Los Angeles" by Compton Brothers
 "Los Angeles" by Counting Crows
 "Los Angeles" by Daniel Schreiver
 "Los Angeles" by David Benoit
 "Los Angeles" by Denison Witmar
 "Los Angeles" by DJ Dean 
 "Los Angeles" by F Machine
 "Los Angeles" by The Firebird Band
 "Los Angeles" by Flex
 "Los Angeles" by Funk Machine
 "Los Angeles" by Gene Clark
 "Los Angeles" by Haim
 "Los Angeles" by Indra Lesmana
 "Los Angeles" by Jim's Big Ego
 "Los Angeles" by Kill Hannah
 "Los Angeles" by Leo O'Kelly 
 "Los Angeles" by Les Paul
 "Los Angeles" by Lescop
 "Los Angeles" by Margot & the Nuclear So and So's
 "Los Angeles" by Marie France
 "Los Angeles" by Mat Kearney
 "Los Angeles" by The Midnight
 "Los Angeles" by Morten Harket
 "Los Angeles" by Murray Head
 "Los Angeles" by Le Orme
 "Los Angeles" by Ozma
 "Los Angeles" by Pete Chiacchieri
 "Los Angeles" by Peter Bradley Adams
 "Los Angeles" by Porcelain and the Tramps
 "Los Angeles" by The Rosewood Thieves
 "Los Angeles" by Sensation
 "Los Angeles" The 69 Eyes
 "Los Angeles" by Sugarcult
 "Los Angeles" by They Might Be Giants
 "Los Angeles" by Tony Hendrik
 "Los Angeles" by Viva
 "Los Angeles" by Wayne Marley
 "Los Angeles" by X
 "Los Angeles Blues" by Lightnin' Hopkins
 "Los Angeles, California" by Ben Verdery
 "Los Angeles Daze" by People Under The Stairs
 "Los Angeles Eldorado" by Claude Nougaro
 "Los Angeles, I'm Yours" by The Decemberists
 "Los Angeles Is A Desert" by Invisibleland
 "Los Angeles Is Burning" by Bad Religion
 "Los Angeles Leavin`" by David Patton
 "Los Angeles, Los Angeles by The Zanies
 "Los Angeles Midnite Groove" by Otis Spann
 "Los Angeles Mood (Chromium Descensions)" by Tom Waits
 "Los Angeles November 2019" by Vangelis (Blade Runner)
 "Los Angeles Poem" by Living Legends
 "Los Angeles River" by Russell Garcia & His Orchestra
 "Los Angeles Serenade" by Livingston Taylor
 "Los Angeles: The Song" by Justin Chart
 "Los Angeles Street Cleaner" by Paul Smith & Peter Brewis
 "Los Angeles Theme (Another Private Dick)" by Tom Waits
 "Los Angeles Times" by Gord Downie
 "Los Angeles Times" by Xzibit
 "Los Angeles Twist And Freeze" by Orlie & The Saints
 "Los Angeles Waltz" by Razorlight
 "Los Angeles Worldwide" by Good Charlotte
 "Los Angelenos" by Billy Joel
 "Losers in L.A." by Funki Porcini
 "Losing California" by Sloan
 "Lost Angel" by Frank Ocean
 "Lost Angels (L.A. L.A.)" by Cold 187um
 "Lost Angeles" by Colosseum
 "Lost Angeles" by Giorgio Moroder
 "Lost in Hollywood" by The Adventures
 "Lost in Hollywood" by Ann Lewis
 "Lost in Hollywood" by Rainbow
 "Lost in Hollywood" by System of a Down
 "Lost in Hollywood" by Wall Street Crash
 "Lost in L.A." by David Grahame
 "Lost in L.A." by Playgroup
 "Lost In Los Angeles" by Fear
 "Lost in the City of Angels" by L.A. Guns
 "Lost in the Hills of Hollywood" by Volunteers
 "Lost In Watts" by Sub Sub
 "Lost You to L.A." by Patsy Gallant
 "Lou Reed At Disneyland" by Yul-Peter
 "Love Is the Great Pretender" by Animal Nightlife
 "Love It When U Love Me" by ieuan
 "Love Not Hollywood" by The Flicks
 "Love Potion Number Nine" by The Searchers
 "Love Power" by Dionne Warwick
 "Low Rider" by War
 "Lowrider (On The Boulevard)" by Latin Alliance (featuring Frost)
 "Lucy and Ramona and Sunset Sam (Cruisin')" by Michael Nesmith
 "Lullaby" by Shawn Mullins
 "MacArthur Park" by Jimmy Webb
 "Madame Hollywood" by Felix da Housecat featuring Miss Kittin
 "Made in Hollywood" by Daniel Boone
 "Made in Hollywood" by LANY
 "Mae Jean Goes to Hollywood" by Jackson Browne
 "Magic Johnson" by Red Hot Chili Peppers
 "Make It Funky (Full Version)" by James Brown
 "Makin' It" by David Naughton
 "Malibu" by Art Mooney
 "Malibu" by Baya
 "Malibu" by Benny Carter
 "Malibu" by Bruce Johnston
 "Malibu" by Calvin "Fuzzy" Samuels (from Manassas)
 "Malibu" by Catch
 "Malibu" by Charles Lloyd
 "Malibu" by George Duke
 "Malibu" by Full Moon (featuring Buzz Feiten)
 "Malibu" by Hole
 "Malibu" by Jagúar
 "Malibu" by Jean Tordo
 "Malibu" by Joe Farrell
 "Malibu" by Joe Walsh
 "Malibu" by Jucifer
 "Malibu" by Lee Ritenour
 "Malibu" by María Duval
 "Malibu" by Masayoshi Takanaka 
 "Malibu" by Miley Cyrus
 "Malibu" by Patricia Paay
 "Malibu" by Piero Piccioni
 "Malibu" by Sons Of Moses
 "Malibu" by Taylor Swift
 "Malibu" by Tom Scott
 "Malibu" by Baya
 "Malibu" by The Tymes
 "A Malibu" by Caroline Loeb
 "Malibu 69" by Grant McLennan
 "Malibu and You" by Colleen Lovett
 "Malibu Barbie" by Brothers of Brazil
 "Malibu/Battle At Malibu House" by Michel Colombier
 "Malibu Bay" by Dennis O'Brien
 "Malibu Beach Nightmare" by Hanoi Rocks
 "Malibu Beat" by Tito Puente
 "Malibu Breeze" by Richie Cole
 "A Malibu Chronicle" by Ginger
 "Malibu Dreams" by Kenny G
 "Malibu Gas Station" by Sonic Youth
 "Malibu Glide" by Clare Fischer & Salsa Picante With 2 + 2
 "Malibu Moonlight" by Stan Kenton
 "Malibu Nights" by LANY
 "Malibu Kind of Christmas" by The Malibooz
 "Malibu Lighthouse" by Malibu's Kazoos
 "Malibu Love Nest" by Luna
 "Malibu Man" by Randy Bernsen
 "Malibu Party" by Lennie Niehaus Quintet
 "Malibu People" by John Phillips
 "Malibu Rain" by Chris Christian
 "Malibu Reggae" by Jack DeJohnette's Directions
 "Malibu Road" by ATB
 "Malibu Road" by Mike Greene
 "Malibu Run" by The Fender IV
 "Malibu Shuffle" by Rodney Franklin
 "Malibu Sunset" by Bruce Rowland
 "Malibu Surf" by The Cornells
 "Malibu U" by Harpers Bizarre
 "Mama Rita In Hollywood" by Doug Kershaw
 "Mama Told Me Not to Come" by Three Dog Night
 "Man of the Year" by Schoolboy Q
 "Mannehole March" by Terry Gibbs Quartet
 "Manning Avenue" by Royal Jesters
 "Mansions of Los Feliz" by Eels
 "Maria Elena (Letter from L.A.)" by Concrete Blonde Y Los Illegals
 "Marilyn (Auf Dem Sunset Boulevard)" by Lilli Berlin
 "Marina Del Rey" by George Strait
 "Marina Del Ray" by Lunch At Allen's
 "Marina Del Rey" by Marc Jordan
 "Marla's Memory Lane" by Who-Dun-It (produced by Monk Higgins - the title refers to a famous Los Angeles jazz club)
 "Marley Purt Drive" by Bee Gees
 "Marlows L.A. Blues" by Milt Buckner
 "Marmendy Mill" by The Turtles
 "Marriage Made in Hollywood" by Paul Brady
 "Mary C. Brown and the Hollywood Sign" by Dory Previn
 "Maryland" by Vonda Shepard
 "Maybe the People Would Be the Times or Between Clark and Hilldale" by Love
 "Me and My Shadow" by Frank Sinatra and Sammy Davis Jr.
 "Me Name Chaka Demus" by Chaka Demus
 "Meanwhile In Hollywood" by Elle Milano
 "The Medal Song" by Culture Club
 "Meet at Sunset and Highland" by Gary Farr
 "Meet Me in Montana" by Dan Seals and Marie Osmond
 "Megablast (Hip Hop on Precinct 13)" by Bomb The Bass
 "Melrose Avenue" by Bruce Joyner
 "Melrose Avenue" by California Guitar Trio
 "Memories of El Monte" by The Penguins
 "Men in This Town" by Shakira
 "Men's Room, L.A." by Kinky Friedman
 "The Mermaid Parade" by Phosphorescent
 "The Message. An Original Hollywood Theme" by Cabaret Voltaire
 "Mexico, Manhattan & Malibu" by Malcolm McLaren
 "Mid-City Fiesta" by People Under The Stairs
 "Midnight at Pink's" by Hal Blaine
 "Midnight City" by M83
 "Midnight Flyer" by Nat 'King' Cole
 "Midnight in L.A." by Dave Davies
 "Midnight Train to Georgia" by Gladys Knight and the Pips
 "Minns Du Hollywood" by Tomas Ledin
 "Miss Hollywood" by Warfield Spillers
 "Miss Malibu" by Bobby Irving (reggae)
 "Mistake I Made In L.A." by Arthur Crudup
 "MM of LA" by Paper Bubble
 "Moment 4 Life" by Nicki Minaj
 "Moment in Hyde Park" by David Benoit
 "Mood Hollywood" by Dorsey Brothers
 "Moon Over Malibu" by Brian Protheroe
 "Moonlight Drive" by The Doors
 "Mount Vernon and Fairway – Theme"  by Beach Boys
 "Move It" by Cliff Richard with Brian May & Brian Bennett
 "Movin' Thru L.A." by Gary Farr
 "Moving to LA" by Art Brut
 "Mr Bubble Goes to Hollywood" by Brand X
 "Mr DJ" by the Concept
 "Mucho Macho" by Toto Coelo
 "Mulholland" by Jan Berry
 "Mulholland Drive" by Ace Dinning
 "Mulholland Drive" by Gaslight Anthem
 "Mulholland Drive" by Keith Harman
 "Mulholland Drive Cafe" by Seiko Matsuda
 "Mulholland Falls" by Dave Grusin
 "Mulholland Nights" by The Crusaders
 "Murder At Peyton Hall" by Charlie Barnet
 "Murder On Sunset Strip" by Crashed Out
 "Music Strings/Oh Hollywood" by Mary McCaslin
 "My 64" by Mike jones, Bun B, & Snoop Dogg
 "My Adidas" by Run-DMC
 "My Beloved Malibu" by The Malibooz
 "My Heart Belongs To Los Angeles" by Teddy Phillips Orchestra
 "My L.A." by Tacey Robbins And The Vendells
 "My Life" by Billy Joel
 "My Life" by Slaughterhouse
 "My Town" by Hollywood Undead

N–R
 "N.J. to L.A." by Naughty By Nature
 "N. Koreatown" by Brazzaville
 "NYLA" by Blackbear
 "NY LA" by Steve Cole
 "NY/LA Rappers" by Jimmy And The Critters Russ Parr
 "NY NY LA LA" by Lil Mama and Snoop Dogg
 "Nashville, You Ain't Hollywood" by Linda Hargrove
 "Nashville's Gone Hollywood" by Heather Myles
 "Nashville's Gone to Hollywood" by Bob Hayes
 "The Neighborhood" by Los Lobos
 "Never Been To Burbank" by David Freeman (musician)
 "New Hollywood Plots" by Sammy Fain and Paul Francis Webster
 "New Year's Eve (Back at the House on Sunset)" (from the musical 'Sunset Boulevard')
 "The New York Debut of an L.A. Artist (Jazz Crowd)" by Andy Prieboy
 "New York - L.A." by Grandmaster Melle Mel & Scorpio
 "New York to California" by Mat Kearney
 "The Next Plane to L.A." by Fred Carter, Jr.
 "Next Plane to London" by The Rose Garden
 "Nichols Canyon Fuunk" by Buddy Miles
 "A Night at El Camino" by Buddy Collette Big Band 
 "A Night in L.A." by Ry Cooder
 "Night in Watts" by Rhino 39
 "No.5" by Hollywood Undead
 "No Holiday in L.A." by Ronnie Prophet
 "No Hollywood Ending" by The Fixx
 "No Hollywood Movie" by Lesley Hamilton
 "No More Parties in LA" by Kanye West
 "No Other Place" by Hollywood Undead
 "No Peace, Los Angeles" by Mike Doughty
 "No Room in Frame" by Death Cab for Cutie
 "No Se Vende La Calle" by Doc Gyneco
 "No Sleep till Brooklyn" by Beastie Boys
 "Nobody Walks in L.A." by Ashford & Simpson
 "Not So Bad In LA" by Allie X
 "Not a Dull Moment" by Bad Astronaut
 "Not Now John" by Pink Floyd
 "Nothing Like L.A." by Ice Cube
 "Nothing's Real in L.A." by Oliver Sain
 "Now I'm a Fool" by Eagles of Death Metal
 "Nuke Beverly Hills" by Booger Barcaloo, Meltdownaires
 "Nuthin' But A 'G' Thang" by Dr. Dre and Snoop Dogg
 "O.K., L.A." by Mayf Nutter
 "OK L.A." by Propeller
 "Obsessed" by Mariah Carey
 "Ocean Avenue" by Lee Ritenour
 "Ocean Front Walk" by Charles Wright
 "Ode to L.A." by The Raveonettes
 "Oh, Cumberland" by Nitty Gritty Dirt Band
 "Oh God, I Wish I Was Home Tonight" by Rod Stewart
 "Oh, La Brea" by Man Man
 "Oh What You Said (Are We Burnt Up?)" by Charlie Barnet (about the 1939 fire at the Palomar Ballroom)
 "Old Hollywood" by Julian Casablancas
 "Old L.A." by Buckwheat
 "Old L.A." by Mike McDonald
 "Old L.A. Tonight" by Ozzy Osbourne
 "Old School Hollywood" by System of a Down
 "Olé Mulholland" by Frank Black
 "Olvera Street" by Gordon Brisker
 "On Fire" by Tone-Loc
 "On Gallery Row" by Richard X. Heyman 
 "On Larrabee" by Rockin' Foo
 "On My Way in L.A." by Phil Carmen
 "On My Way to L.A." by Lighthouse
 "On My Way (To Old L.A.)" by Jerry Palmer
 “On Point” by House Of Pain
 "On Sunset" by The Decades
 "On The Boulevard" by Dr. Dre & Snoop Dogg
 "On the Floor" by Jennifer Lopez feat. Pitbull
 "On the Way to L.A." by We The People
 "On to Hollywood" music by James F. Hanley; lyrics by Eddie Dowling  
 "On to L.A." by Manny Fryzer
 "Onda Callejera" by Ry Cooder
 "One in a Million" by Guns N' Roses
 "One Night in Eagle Rock by Titanic (band)
 "One Night in Hollywood" by Feargal Sharkey
 "One Night in Hollywood" (from the film 'He's My Girl')
 "Only a Demo (Acid Fingers Rap Session)" by Simon Harris
 "Only in California" by Mack 10
 "Only in L.A." by Bizzy Bone
 "Only The Loot Can Make Me Happy" by R. Kelly
 "Ooh La La in L.A." by Slade
 "Open Up" by Leftfield
 "Orange Drive" by Joachim Kuhn Band
 "Orange Driver" by Eddie "Guitar" Burns
 "Order Through Chaos" by Psycho Realm
 "Orpheus Dreams of Disneyland" by Bill Nelson
 "Otra Noche en L.A." by Ricky Martin
 "Out Come The Freaks" by Was (Not Was)
 "Out in L.A." by Red Hot Chili Peppers
 "Out of L.A." by Jude
 "Out on the Weekend" by Neil Young
 "Outside L.A." by Nat T Jones
 "Out L.A. Way" by Steve Wilson 
 "Over Shadow Hill Way" by Wayne Shorter Quartet
 "The Overachievers" by Liars
 "PCH (Pacific Coast Highway)" Gerald "Twig" Smith
 "Pacific Coast Highway" by Burt Bacharach
 "Pacific Coast Highway" by Edward Hand
 "Pacific Coast Highway" by Electracoustic
 "Pacific Coast Highway" by Hole
 "Pacific Coast Highway" by The Mamas & the Papas
 "Pacific Coast Highway" by Sonic Youth
 "Pacific Coast Party" by Smash Mouth
 "Pacific Palisades" (hymn tune)
 "Pacoima Stomp" by Carter Brothers
 "Palladium Party" by Harry James
 "Palladium Punch" by Ralph Flanagan & His Orchestra ('Palladium' is the Hollywood Palladium)
 "Palm Desert" by Van Dyke Parks
 "Palm Dreams" by Hayley Kiyoko
 "Palmdale" by Soho (band)
 "Palms Blvd." by Leo Kottke
 "Panic Zone" by N.W.A
 "Paradise City" by Guns N' Roses
 "Paramount Conversations" (from the musical 'Sunset Boulevard')
 "Parking In Westwood" by Rob Mullins
 "Party at the Rainbow" by Sacred Child
 "Party in Hollywood" by London
 "Party in the U.S.A." by Miley Cyrus
 "Pasadena" by Done Lying Down
 "Pasadena" by Duesenberg
 "Pasadena" by Glen South
 "Pasadena" by John Edmond
 "Pasadena" by John Paul Young
 "Pasadena" by Maywood
 "Pasadena" by Modern Skirts
 "Pasadena" by Pussycat
 "Pasadena" by Temperance Seven
 "Pasadena Airport" by Hydravion
 "Pasadena Day March" by Vessella's Italian Band	
 "Pasadena Days" by Paul Brett's Sage
 "Pasadena Dreamworld" by Time Bandits (band)
 "Pasadena Flight" by Hendric Haydegg
 "Pasadena Love Story" by Mark Mulcahy
 "Pasadena Penthouse" by Darren Statler
 "Pasadena Rhumboogie" by Joe Lutcher
 "Pasadena Sungodown" by Broadcast (yhtye)
 "Pasadena Town" by Les Humphries
 "Pasadena's On My Mind" by Barry Travers
 "Payphone" by Maroon 5 
 "Peace Frog" by The Doors
 "Peace in L.A." by Tom Petty and the Heartbreakers
 "Peace Treaty" by Kam
 "The Pendulum At Falcon's Lair" by Oscar Pettiford Orchestra
 "Pershing Square" by Dario Marianelli
 "Pershing Square" by Jackie Lee
 "Pershing Square" by Mark Mancina
 "Pershing Square" by Stan Kenton
 "Piano Man" by Billy Joel
 "Pico and Sepulveda" by Felix Figueroa & His Orchestra (regularly featured on Dr. Demento's syndicated radio show)
 "Pico-Union District" by Psycho Realm
 "Picture Postcards from L.A." by Joshua Kadison
 "Pigeon of L.A." by East Side Kids
 "Pike Street - Park Slope" by Harvey Danger (mentions both New York City & Los Angeles)
 "Pimpin'" by Hollywood Undead
 "Plastic Hearts" by Miley Cyrus
 "Playa Del Rey" by Warne Marsh Quartet
 "Please Come to Boston" by Dave Loggins
 "Plummer Park" by Pete Jolly
 "Point Fermin" by Buddy Collette Big Band
 "Poor Little Hollywood Star" (from the musical 'Little Me')
 "Poor Man's Shangri-La" by Ry Cooder
 "Postcard from Hollywood" by Andrew Matheson (musician)
 "Postcard from L.A." by UK Subs
 "Postcards from Hollywood" by Ned Doheny
 "The Powder Room" by Fiction Factory (Hollywood)
 "Powerhouse" by The Game
 "Pretty Little Gangster" by Ryder
 "Pretty Tied Up" by Guns N' Roses
 "Prince Of Belair" by Shaggy Wonder (reggae)
 "Progressive Country Music For A Hollywood Flapper" by Hank Penny
 "Promised Land" by Chuck Berry
 "Prophet" by Jude
 "Public Enemy #1" by Public Enemy
 "Pulaski" by Drive-By Truckers
 "Punch Out at Malibu" by Surf Punks
 "Punky's Dilemma" by Simon and Garfunkel
 "Purple Stain" by Red Hot Chili Peppers
 "Put My Star (On the Sidewalk of Hollywood)" by Altrinna Grayson
 "Qué Onda Guero?" by Beck
 "The Queen of 1964" by Neil Sedaka
 "The Queen of Hollywood High" by John Stewart
 "Radio" by Lana Del Rey
 "Radio Waves" by Roger Waters
 "Ragga Bomb" by Skrillex
 "Raining in California" by Human Nature
 "Raining in L.A." by IIIrd Tyme Out
 "Raining in L.A." by Renee Armand
 "Rainy Day in L.A." by Marvin Jenkins
 "Rampage In L.A." by Mad Professor
 “Ready Or Not” by Fugees
 "Ready To Roll (London to L.A.)" by Bam Bam & Pebbles
 "The Real El Rey" by Frank Black
 "The Recipe" by Kendrick Lamar featuring Dr. Dre
 "Red Hollywood" by The Bible
 "Redondo Beach" by Patti Smith, later covered by Morrissey
 "Reggae On Sunset" by Dhaima (reggae)
 "Regulate" by Warren G
 "Release the Stars" by Rufus Wainwright
 "Revolution Blues" by Neil Young
 "Rich People of Hollywood" by Stanley Wilson
 "Ridin' Down Ole 99" by Joe & Rose Lee Maphis
 "Riot on 103rd Street" by Mother Earth
 "Riot on Sunset Strip" by The Standells
 "Ritmo De Los Angeles" by Phil Manzanera
 "The River" by Good Charlotte
 "Roadblock" (Ben Liebrand mix) by Stock Aitken & Waterman
 "Rock & Roll Hollywood" by Simon Stokes
 "Rock in L.A." by PFM
 "Rock 'n' Me" by Steve Miller Band
 "Rockaway to Sunset" by Spyro Gyra
 "Rockin' and Rollin' on the Streets of Hollywood" by Buddy Miles
 "Rockin' at the Philharmonic" by Chuck Berry
 "Rockin' Hollywood" by Bootleg Family Band
 "Rockin' in L.A." by Teazer
 "Rockin' L.A." by Billy Burnette
 "Rock Show" by Paul McCartney and Wings
 "Rodeo Drive" by Sniff 'n' the Tears
 "Rodeo Drive (High Steppin')" by The Crusaders
 "Rodney's English Disco" by International Language
 "Rolling On Western Avenue" by Big Joe Turner
 "Romance in Beverly Hills" by Gary Farr
 "Rooming House on Venice Beach" by Jonathan Richman
 "Rose of Bel-Air" by David Rose & His Orchestra
 "Rosecrans Blvd" by 5th Dimension
 "Route 66" by many artists
 "Route 66" by ATB
 "Route 101" by Herb Alpert
 "Run Run Run" by David Blue
 "Runaway Horses" by Belinda Carlisle
 "Runnin' Blue" by The Doors

S
 "Safe in LA" by Gold Motel
 "Saint Joseph High School Dance" by York Brothers
 "Saints of Los Angeles" by Mötley Crüe
 "Salute" by Slaughterhouse
 "Samba De Los Angeles" by Gilberto Gil
 "Samba L.A." by Chick Corea
 "San Fernando" by Mary McCaslin
 "San Fernando Line" by Springfield Revival
 "San Fernando Road" by Flying Burrito Brothers
 "San Fernando Square" by Spade Cooley
 "San Fernando Valley" by Bing Crosby
 "Sands of Malibu" by Johnny and the Mark V
 "Santa Ana Wind" by Nashville Edition
 "Santa Ana Wind" by Skip Battin
 "Santa Ana Winds" by Beach Boys
 "Santa Ana Winds" by Christopher
 "Santa Ana Winds" by Cold War Kids
 "Santa Ana Winds" by Everclear
 "The Santa Ana Winds" by Gary Farr
 "Santa Ana Winds" by Janey Street
 "Santa Ana Winds" by Lalomie Washburn
 "Santa Ana Winds" by Ray Frushay
 "Santa Ana Winds" by Sons of Bill
 "Santa Ana Winds" by Steve Goodman
 "Santa Ana Winds" by Survivor
 "Santa Ana Winds" by The Wedding Present
 "Santa Ana Woman" by The Bobs
 "Santa Ana's Blowing" by Big Al Blake* & The Hollywood Fats Band 
 "Santa Anna Speed Queen" by Fat Water
 "Santa Anna Winds" by Freddie Hubbard
 "Santa Barbara and Crenshaw Follies" by David Murray
 "Santa Fe Express" by Spade Cooley
 "Santa Monica" by Bedouin Soundclash
 "Santa Monica" by Ben Cramer
 "Santa Monica" by Buddy Collette
 "Santa Monica" by Everclear
 "Santa Monica" by Hothouse Flowers
 "Santa Monica" by Paul Smith (rock vocalist) & Peter Brewis
 "Santa Monica" by Peter Holsapple And Chris Stamey
 "Santa Monica" by Savage Garden
 "Santa Monica" by Steve Slagle
 "Santa Monica" by Theory of a Deadman
 "Santa Monica" by Tribb
 "Santa Monica" by Véronique Sanson
 "Santa Monica Bay" by Consortium
 "Santa Monica Bay" by Leif Garrett
 "Santa Monica Bound" by Alan Parker
 "Santa Monica Dream" by Angus & Julia Stone
 "Santa Monica Flyer" by the Hunters
 "Santa Monica Friend" by String Driven Thing
 "Santa Monica Jump" by Slim Gaillard
 "The Santa Monica Mix" by Gary Farr
 "Santa Monica Nights" by David Hasselhoff
 "Santa Monica Pier" by Bishop & Gwinn
 "The Santa Monica Pier" by Christine Lavin
 "Santa Monica Pier" by Noel Harrison
 "Santa Monica Rambler" by Spade Cooley
 "Santa Monica Sunshine" by Sweet
 "Saticoy Street" by Big Sir
 "Saturday Night at the Movies" by The Drifters
 "Saturday Night in Watts Act One" by Hal Singer
 "Saturday Night on Sunset Strip" by Edd Byrnes
 "Say Goodbye to Hollywood" by Billy Joel in 1976, by Bette Midler and by Ronnie Spector in 1977
 "Say Goodbye to Hollywood" by Eminem
 "Say Goodbye to Hollywood" by Saga
 "Scene for Dummies" by Hollywood Undead
 "Scream in the Night" by Garland Jeffreys
 "Screen Kiss" by Thomas Dolby
 "Screenwriter's Blues" by Soul Coughing
 "Secret Motel" by Xiu Xiu
 "See You in L.A." by Mascara
 "Setting the World on Fire" by Kenny Chesney
 "Sex and Dying in High Society" by X
 "Shade 45 Freestyle" by The Game
 "Shadow Hills California" by Head of David
 "Shaky Town" by Jackson Browne
 "Shangri-LA" by Barry Sparks
 "She Creatures of the Hollywood Hills" by The Stooges
 "She Devils of Beverly Hills" by The Automatics
 "She Has Friends in L.A." by John Carpenter
 "She's Gone to L.A. Again" by Oakridge Boys
 "She's in L.A." by Eddie "Guitar" Burns
 "She's Off to L.A." by California Cowboys
 "Sheik of Encino" by Scott Henderson, Gary Willis, Tribal Tech  
 "Shoorah Shoorah for Hollywood" by Bay City Rollers
 "Shooting Star" by Poison
 "Showdown (Riot on Sunset)" by L.A. Guns
 "Shrinking in L.A." by Robert Tepper
 "Shufflin' at the Hollywood" by Lionel Hampton
 "Si Je N'ai Rien De Toi" by Celine Dion
 "Sick Again" by Led Zeppelin
 "Sidewalk Requiem, Los Angeles, June 5th and 6th" by Chad Stuart And Jeremy Clyde
 "Sidewalks of L.A." by Wylie Gustafson & The Wild West Show
 "Signed Dangerous of Hollywood" by 999
 "Silent Love Song" by Jason Mraz
 "Silent Night/7 O' Clock News" by Simon & Garfunkel
 "Silverlake" by Michelle Featherstone
 "Silverlake" by Steve Young
 "Silverlake" by Yellowjackets
 "Simple Life (Ode to L.A.)" by Valdy
 "Sin City" by The Flying Burrito Brothers
 "Sketches on Sunset" by California Guitar Trio
 "Skies of L.A." by Céline Dion
 "Slaughter on Sunset Strip" by White Fence
 "Slaughterhouse" by Joe Budden
 "Slauson Cut Off" by Tom Kubis
 "Slauson Party" by Round Robin
 "Slauson Shuffle" by The Romancers
 "Slauson Shuffletime" by Round Robin
 "Slauson Town" by Round Robin
 "Slauson USA" by Little Winfrey
 "The Sleep of Hollywood" by Bill Nelson
 "Sleepless in Silverlake" by Les Savy Fav
 "Sleepy Slept Here (Santa Monica)" by Chico Hamilton Quintet
 "Smile LA, You're The Centre Of The World" by Edward Hand
 "Smog L.A." by Charles Mingus
 "Smokey Mountain Rain" by Ronnie Milsap
 "Smokin' Me Out" by Warren G featuring Ronald Isley
 "Smooth Operator" by Sade
 "Smuggler's Blues" by Glenn Frey
 "Snoop's Upside Your Head" by Snoop Dogg
 "So at Last" by Butch Walker
 "So.Cal" by Delinquent Habits
 "So Far Away from L.A."  by Nicolas Peyrac
 "So Hollywood" by Filmstars
 "So L.A." by The Motels
 "So Much for L.A." by D.C. LaRue
 "So N.Y." by Fabolous
 "Som I En Gammel Hollywoodfilm" by Inger Lise Rypdal 
 "Some L.A. Niggaz" by Dr. Dre
 "Some Other Time" by X
 "Somebody Called L.A." by Tony Booth
 "Somethin' 4 Da Honeyz" by Montell Jordan
 "Something About the Sunshine" by Anna Margaret
 "Something's Goin' On Inside L.A." by Jiva 
 "Somewhere in Hollywood" by 10cc
 "Somewhere in My Heart" by Aztec Camera
 "A Sorta Fairytale" by Tori Amos 
 "Soul Travelin' (The G.B.E.)" by Gary Byrd
 "South Bay Surfers" by The Intelligence
 "South Central" by Super Cat
 "South Central Avenue Municipal Blues Band" by South Central Avenue Municipal Blues Band
 "South Central L.A. Kulture" by Wadada Leo Smith
 "South Central Madness" by South Central Cartel
 "South Central Rain" by R.E.M.
 "South in New Orleans" by Johnnie Wright
 "Southern California" by Tammy Wynette and George Jones
 "Southern Cross" by Crosby, Stills, Nash & Young
 "Spahn Ranch" by Hoodoo Gurus
 "Spectacular Views" by Rilo Kiley
 "Speedin' on Da Highway/Exit 13" by LL Cool J
 "Spill the Wine" by Eric Burdon and War (American band)
 "Spoiled Brats from Malibu" by Surf Punks
 "Springfield Plane" by Kenny O'Dell
 "Squeeze the Trigger" by Ice-T
 "St. Francis Dam Disaster" by Frank Black and the Catholics
 "(Standing on) The Sunset Strip" by The Zoo
 "Star" by Second Image
 "Stars in Hollywood" by Emerson
 "Stars Over Hollywood" by Jack Grunsky
 "Stein On Vine" by Louis Bellson
 "Stella, This Ain't Hollwood" by DeGarmo and Key
 "Still in Hollywood" by Concrete Blonde
 "Stockholm-L.A." by Al Cohn
 "Stone Cold Hollywood" by Bill Champlin
 "Storia in L.A" by PFM
 "Straight Outta Compton" by N.W.A
 "Straight to Watts" by Jimmy O'Brien
 "Stranded in L.A." by L.A. Guns
 "Stranded in L.A." by Wailing Souls
 "Strange Season" by Michael Penn (references Angels Flight railway in Downtown Los Angeles)
 "The Streets" by Sick Jacken of Psycho Realm
 "Streets Of L.A." by Jack Tempchin
 "Strike Up the Band for UCLA" by George Gershwin and Ira Gershwin
 "Struttin' On Sunset" by Merv Griffin
 "Stuck in a Pagoda with Tricia Toyota" by The Dickies
 "Stuck in L.A." by Spirit
 "Studio City (Misery Loves Company)" by John Taylor (bass guitarist)
 "Suicide & Vine" by Peter McCann
 "Summer" by War (American band)
 "Summer in Bel Air" by Roland Thyssen
 "Summer in Malibu" by Lou Christie
 "Summer Means Fun" by Bruce & Terry
 "Summer Nights In Hollywood" by Brian Elliot
 "Summer On Signal Hill" by Clarence Clemons
 "Summit Ridge Drive" by Artie Shaw
 "Sun Valley Jump" by Glenn Miller
 "Sunday At The Hillcrest" by Charlie Haden
 "Sunday in L.A." by Michael Jarrett
 "Sunday Night in San Fernando" by Mel Tormé
 "Sundown on Sunset" by Kagny
 "Sunken Waltz" by Calexico
 "Sunrise in Malibu" by Horace Silver
 "Sunrise on Sunset" by Arlyn Gale
 "Sunrise on Sunset" by Hollywood Stars
 "Sunset" by Kid Ink
 "Sunset After Midnight" by Bad Moon Rising
 "Sunset and Vine" by The Charlatans (UK band)
 "Sunset and Vine" by Earl Dukes
 "Sunset and Vine" by Kim Morrison
 "Sunset and Vine" by Norro Wilson
 "Sunset and Vine" by Passion
 "Sunset and Vine" by Waylon Jennings
 "Sunset and Vine" by Willie Headen
 "Sunset and Wine" by Bud Shank & Bob Cooper (musician)
 "Sunset and Wine" by Randy King
 "Sunset at Noon" by Kenny G
 "Sunset Blvd." by ManMachineMan
 "Sunset Boulevard" by Alex M.O.R.P.H. featuring Ana Criado
 "Sunset Boulevard" by Cal Tjader & Claus Ogerman
 "Sunset Boulevard" by Calvin "Fuzzy" Samuels (from Manassas (band))
 "Sunset Boulevard" by Charlie Robison
 "Sunset Boulevard" by City Boy
 "Sunset Blvd" by Emblem3
 "Sunset Boulevard" by Flying Burrito Brothers
 "Sunset Boulevard" by Joey Scarbury
 "Sunset Boulevard" by John Phillips
 "Sunset Boulevard" by Kim Fowley
 "Sunset Boulevard" by Lena Maria
 "Sunset Boulevard" by Remy Filipovitch Trio 
 "Sunset Boulevard" by The Syn
 "Sunset Boulevard" by Thomas Wood
 "Sunset Boulevard" by Virgo
 "Sunset Boulevard" by 'Wah Wah' Watson
 "Sunset Boulevard" (from the musical of the same name)
 "Sunset Boulevard Concerto" by 101 Strings
 "Sunset Cruzin' (Crazy)" by Chris Paul & Mia V
 "Sunset Grill" by Don Henley
 "Sunset on L.A." by Gino Vannelli
 "Sunset on Sunset" by Tina Turner
 "Sunset on Sunset Boulevard" by David Olney
 "Sunset People" by Donna Summer
 "Sunset Queen" by Frank CarilloAnd Annie Golden
 "Sunset Strip" by The Agency
 "Sunset Strip" by Courtney Love
 "Sunset Strip" by Jimmy Dorsey
 "Sunset Strip" by The Numbers
 "Sunset Strip" by Ray Stevens
 "Sunset Strip" by Reg Owen
 "Sunset Strip" by Roger Waters
 "Sunset Strip" by David Rose & His Orchestra
 "Sunset Strut" by Bitch
 "Sunset Symphony" by People of Sunset Strip
 "Sunset Tower" by Stan Kenton & His Orchestra
 "Sunshine Way" by Christine Tavares-Mocha
 "Superthug" by Noreaga
 "Surf City" by Jan and Dean
 "Surfin' Safari" by The Beach Boys
 "Surfin' U.S.A." by The Beach Boys
 "Surfin U.S.S.R" by Ray Stevens
 "Surf Route 101" by Jan and Dean
 "Survival Test" by Jaylib
 "Sweet Dreams My L.A. Ex" by Rachel Stevens
 "Sweet L.A." by Morcheeba
 "Swing In L.A." by Interstate (produced by Yves Deruyter)
 "Swingin' at the Tower" by Ray Anthony
 "Swingin' on Central" by The Sunset All Stars with Nat 'King' Cole, Charlie Shavers & Buddy Rich
 "Swingin' on the Strip"  (Original Soundtrack of '77 Sunset Strip")

T
 "Take It to the Hoop - L.A. Lakers" by Mighty Fire
 "Take Manhattan" by Soul Asylum
 "Take Me Along" by Miley Cyrus
 "Take Me Back to Hollywood" by Ted
 "Take Me Back To L.A." by Jimmy Namaro Quintet And Frankie Laine Orchestra 
 "Take Me to L.A." by Dick Rabbit
 "Take Me To Los Angeles" by Jimmy Soul
 "Take Them to the Traitors' Gate" by Thinkman
 "Tale of Two Cities" by The Lords of the New Church
 "A Tale of 2 Citiez" by J. Cole
 "Tales from Tinsel Town" by Sweet Wine
 "Talkin' Baseball" (Forever Dodger Blue)" by Terry Cashman
 "Tear Me Apart" by Suzi Quatro
 "Tell Me Baby" by Red Hot Chili Peppers
 "Thank God for Hollywood" by Robyn Archer
 "That's Hollywood" by Mavis McCauley
 "That's How I'm Livin'" by Ice-T
 "That's How We Do It in L.A." by Lindsey Buckingham
 "That's Why Hollywood Loves Me" by Geno Washington
 "The Hills" by The Weeknd
 "the valley" by Miguel
 "Theme Hollywood" by Mort Shuman
 "Therapy Lounge (L.A.)" by One Hit Wonder (band)
 "There Ain't No Beverly Hills in Tennessee" by Shenandoah
 "There's a Broken Heart for Every Rock and Roll Star on Laurel Canyon Boulevard" by Christopher Milk
 "There's a Tear for Every Smile in Hollywood" (from the musical 'Show Girl In Hollywood')
 "Things Are Looking Good (Out in Hollywood)" by Baker Knight
 "This Ain't Hollywood" by Armand Van Helden
 "This Ain't Hollywood" by Mark Steven Reeve
 "This City Is Named After the Angels" by Robyn Archer
 “This DJ” by Warren G
 "This Hollywood Life" by Suede
 "This Is Compton" by Compton's Most Wanted
 "This Is How We Do It" by Montell Jordan
 "This Is L.A." by The Briggs (Used as the team song for the Los Angeles Galaxy)
 "This Is L.A." by Delinquent Habits
 "This Is L.A." by Lemon D
 "This Is Los Angeles" by WC
 "This Is My Hollywood" by 3 Colours Red
 "This Is Why I Came to California" by Leon Ware
 "This Is Why I'm Hot" by Mims (rapper)
 "This Old World's Too Funky for Me" by Joe Cocker & The Crusaders
 "This Town" by The Go-Go's
 "Three in Venice" by Jimmie Spheeris
 "Three Little Pigs" by Green Jellÿ
 "Throw Up Ya Gunz" by 2Pac
 "Thugz Mansion" by Tupac Shakur
 "Thunder in Tinseltown" by The Wishing Tree
 "Thunder Over Rincon" by Jon And The Nightriders
 "Ticket To Los Angeles" by Gaznevada
 "Tiffany Queen" by The Byrds
 "Time Spent in Los Angeles" by Dawes
 "Tinsel Town" by David Roach (saxophonist)
 "Tinsel Town" by Jimmy Hibbert
 "Tinsel Town" by The Leatherwoods
 "Tinsel Town" by Ronny Jordan
 "Tinsel Town" by Shawn Mullins
 "Tinseltown" by Tony Carey
 "Tinseltown" by The Wisdom Of Harry
 "Tinsel Town (Hitch-A-Ride To Hollywood)" by Jan Berry
 "Tinseltown In The Rain" by The Blue Nile
 "Tinsel Town Theory (a.k.a. The Hollywood Story)" by Lakeside
 "Tinseltown to the Boogiedown" by Scritti Politti
 "Tinsel Town (You Don't Fool Me)" by Linx
 "Tiny Dancer" by Elton John
 "Tiny Vessels" by Death Cab for Cutie
 "To Die in L.A." by West Indian Girl
 "To Live & Die in L.A." by Makaveli
 "To Live and Die in L.A." by Wang Chung
 "To Live & Die in C.A" by Daz Dillinger
 "To Pasadena" by Rankarna
 "To Protect and Entertain" (feat. Murs) by Busy P
 "To Wichita Falls from L.A." by Roberta Sherwood
 "Toluca Lake" by Gregg Karukas
 "Tom Jones International" by Tom Jones
 "Too Dumb for New York City" by Waylon Jennings
 "Too Much Hollywood" by Axewitch
 "Too Much Hollywood" by Bonfire (band)
 "Topanga" by David Soul
 "Topanga" by Kathy Smith
 "Topanga Canyon" by John Phillips
 "Topanga Canyon Road" by The Fun & Games
 "Topanga Road" by Jim and Jean
 "Topanga Windows" by Spirit
 "Torero Cha Cha Cha" by Renato Carosone and his Sextet; and Julius La Rosa 
 "Tough" by Kurtis Blow
 "Tourists Are Invading Hermosa Beach" by The Imposters
 "Train" by Goldfrapp
 "Train to Anaheim" by David Blue
 "The Train to West Covina" by Gary Farr
 "Tremors and Time Steps (One Last Dance for My Father)" by Dory Previn
 "The Trip" by Donovan
 "Trip in Hollywood" by 20/20
 "Trocadero Ballroom" by Swing (Richard Perry)
 "Tropico" by Lana Del Rey
 "Trouble at the Cup" by Black Randy and the Metrosquad
 "Trouble in Tinseltown" by Royal Crown Revue
 "Trouble on My Mind" by Pusha T
 "Truckin' 101" by Leon Redbone
 "Truckin' (They're Going Hollywood in Harlem)" by Martha Raye
 "The Twelve Days of a Los Angeles Ram Christmas" by Elliott, Walter And Bennett
 "Twelve Thirty (Young Girls Are Coming to the Canyon)" by The Mamas & The Papas
 "Twilight In The Northridge" by Tribal Tech
 "Two More Bottles of Wine" by Emmylou Harris
 "Two People from New York (On the Way to L.A.)" by Terry & Laurel

U–V
 "U.C.L.A." by Sylvie Vartan
 "UCLA" by RL Grime
 "Uncomfortably Numb" by Butch Walker
 "The Under Assistant West Coast Promotion Man" by The Rolling Stones
 "Under the Bridge" by the Red Hot Chili Peppers
 "Uneasy Rider" by the Charlie Daniels Band
 "Unfair" by Pavement
 "Unity" by Afrika Bambaataa & James Brown
 "Up All Night (Frankie Miller Goes to Hollywood)" by Counting Crows
 "Uptown L.A." by Beau Coup
 "Urban Futuristic (Son of South Central)" by Pop Will Eat Itself
 "Ustalichka" by Brazzaville
 "Valley Girl" by Frank Zappa
 "Valley Girl Ventriloquist" by Dog Fashion Disco
 "Van Nuys (Es Very Nice)" by Los Abandoned
 "Van Nuys" by Sixx:A.M.
 "Vapors" by Snoop Dogg
 "Venice Beach" by Bob Neuwirth
 "Venice Beach" by The Egg (band)
 "Venice Beach" by Tim Buckley
 "Venice Street Fair" by Brian Auger
 "Venice, USA" by Red Elvises
 "Venice U.S.A." by Van Morrison
 "Ventura Boulevard" by The Frantics (Seattle, Washington)
 "Ventura Boulevard Boogie" by Bobby Troup
 "Ventura Freeway" by Jimmie Haskell
 "Ventura Freeway Blues" by Speedtwinn	
 "Ventura Highway" by America
 "Venturah Boulevard" by Michael J. Smith featuring Jonas Hellborg, Danny Gottlieb, Paul Chelko
 "Via Disneyland" by Screaming Target
 "The Vicodin Song" by Terra Naomi
 "Videos of Hollywood" by Caravan
 "Vine Street" by Randy Newman
 "Vine Street Blues" by Harry James
 "Vine Street Boogie" by Jay McShann Orchestra
 "Vine Street Rag" by Hoagy Carmichael
 "Vine Street Rumble" by Count Basie
 "Vine Street Shimmy" by L.A. Guns
 "Vine Street Shuffle" by Gus Jenkins Orchestra
 "Visions of L.A." by Slowdive
 "Von Hollywood Träumen" by Gitte Hænning

W–Z
 "W.L.A." by Evergreen Blues
 "Waitress At The Troubadour" by Danny Kalb
 "Waitress In The Whiskey" by Peter Sarstedt
 "A Walk In L.A." by Phil Thornalley 
 "Walk South Central" by Kicksquad
 "The Walker" by Fitz and the Tantrums
 "Walking in L.A." by Hagfish
 "Walking in L.A." by Minty's Style
 "Walking in L.A." by Missing Persons
 "Walking in Los Angeles" by Kate Micucci
 "Walking on Sunset" by John Mayall
 "Walking on Wilshire" by Jimmie Haskell
 "Wannabe in L.A." by Eagles of Death Metal
 "War Within a Breath" by Rage Against the Machine
 "Watch Ya Mouth" by 2Pac
 "Waterbeds of Hollywood" by Ann Magnuson
 "Watts" by Brother Woodman & The Chanters 
 "Watts '67" by Harold Johnson Sextet
 "Watts At Sunrise" by David T. Walker
 "Watts Breakaway" by Johnny Otis Show
 "Watts Happening" by (Jazz) Crusaders
 "Watts Happening" by Watts 103rd Street Rhythm Band
 "Watts New" by Le Baron (aka Bernard Estardy)
 "Watts Riot" by Kam
 "Watts Up" by Big Jay McNeely
 "(The Waves of) Lunada Bay" by Jon And The Nightriders
 "Way to L.A." by Bison (featuring Holger Czukay of Can)
 "Wayfarer's Chapel" by Carol Jarvis
 "We Care a Lot" by Faith No More
 "We Lost Our Way" by Chris Isaak
 "We Love the Dodgers" by Jimmie Maddin
 "We Run L.A." by Ya Boy featuring Dr. Hollywood
 "Weekend in L.A." by George Benson
 "Weekend in L.A." by The Toasters
 "Welcome Home" by Kurupt
 "Welcome in L.A." by Official Hot Mess
 "Welcome Me" by Indigo Girls
 "Welcome to Hollywood" by Asylum Choir
 "Welcome to Hollywood" by Gerry Rafferty
 "Welcome to Hollywood" by Glen Burtnick
 "Welcome to Hollywood" by Mitchel Musso
 "Welcome to L.A." by Gene Loves Jezebel
 "Welcome to L.A." by Oliver Tree
 "Welcome to L.A." by Rick Worrall
 "Welcome to My Hollywood" by Praying Mantis
 "Welcome to the Boomtown" by David & David
 "Welcome to the Jungle" by Guns N' Roses
 "Well, Did You Evah!" by Debbie Harry & Iggy Pop
 "Went Looking for Warren Zevon's Los Angeles" by Lucero
 "We're In L.A." By Steve Lawrence
 "We're The L.A. Raiders" by George Semper
 "West Coast" by Lana Del Rey
 "West Coast" by The Neighbourhood
 "West Coast Anthem" by Coolio
 "West Coast Poplock" by Ronnie Hudson
 "West Hollywood" by Jack Blades
 "West L.A. Fadeaway" by Grateful Dead
 "West of Hollywood" by Steely Dan
 "West Up" by WC and the Maad Circle featuring Mack 10 & Ice Cube 
 "Westcoastsynthesizerbeachbumgangstermusic" by King Fantastic
 "Western Ave." by Dyan Diamond
 "Westlake" by Bob Florence
 "Westside" by Mr. Capone-E
 "Westside Slaughterhouse" by Mack 10 featuring Ice Cube & WC (rapper)
 "Westside Story" by The Game
 "Westwood Fallout" by Amen
 "Westwood Walk" by Gerry Mulligan
 "What Am I Doing in L.A.?" by Nat Stuckey
 "What I Got" by Sublime
 "When Canyons Ruled the City" by Butch Walker
 "When Night Comes Down on Sunset" by In Tua Nua
 "When the Shit Hits the Fan/Sunset Blvd." by Todd Rundgren
 "When the Snow Comes Down in Tinseltown" by Hilary Duff
 "When Veronica Plays the Harmonica (Down at the Pier in Santa Monica)" by Kay Kyser
 "Where I'm From" by Game
 "WHERE THE HELL ARE MY FRIENDS" by LANY
 "Which Way To Hollywood" by Rat Cheese
 "Whisky-A-Go-Go" by Johnny Rivers
 "White Christmas" by Bing Crosby
 "White Punks on Dope" by The Tubes
 "Whittier At Midnight" by Tierra
 "Whittier Blvd" by Thee Midniters
 "Who Would've Thought?" by Rancid
 "Who that Girl" by Eve
 "Whores of Hollywood" by Amen
 "Why You'd Want to Live Here" by Death Cab for Cutie
 "Wicked" by Ice Cube
 "Wild Side" by Mötley Crüe
 "William Faulkner In Hollywood" by Tom Russell Band
 "Wilshire Boulevard" by Silk
 "Winds of Santa Ana" by Animal Logic
 "Windy City Polka" by Windy City Brass
 "Wings (London/L.A.)" by Randy Edelman
 "Winnetka Exit" by Styles of Beyond
 "Winter in L.A." by Jigsaw
 "Wintertime in Hollywood" by The Lovetones
 "Wombling White Tie and Tails" by The Wombles
 "Workin' in L.A." by Hagood Hardy
 "Working My Way to L.A." by Jim Ford
 "The World Began in Eden and Ended in Los Angeles" by Phil Ochs
 "The Word Is A Ghetto" by Geto Boys
 "The World Is Mine" by Ice Cube
 "Worst Dominatrix In L.A." by Modern Man
 "Wrightwood Drive" by Stu Phillips
 "Wrong Way to Hollywood" by Wall of Voodoo
 "Yesterday in L.A." by David Essex
 "Yo Home to Bel-Air" by DJ Jazzy Jeff & The Fresh Prince
 "You Are Hollywood" by Burn The Negative
 "You Can Strike Oil - In Hollywood" by The Sheikettes
 "You Got to Have It in Hollywood" by Irving Berlin
 "You Haven't Lived Until You've Played the Palace" by Carol Channing
 "You Know How We Do It" by Ice Cube
 "You May Be Too Much for Memphis, Baby (But You're Not Enough for L.A.)" by Eddy Arnold
 "You Never Know What You Got (Til It's Gone)" by Me and You (band)
 "Your Drug Is Hollywood" by Francie Conway
 "Your Girl's Here Pt. II" by World's Fair
 "You're the Reason God Made Oklahoma" by David Frizzell & Shelly West
 "Zombies in Disneyland" by Doctor And The Crippens
 "Zoot Suit Riot" by Cherry Poppin' Daddies

References

Los Angeles
Songs
Songs

Culture of Los Angeles